= 64th Utah State Legislature =

64th Session 2021-2022
- Utah State Legislature

Type
- Term limits: None

History
- New session started: January 19, 2021

Leadership
- Speaker of the House: Brad Wilson (R) since November 8, 2018
- House Majority Leader: Francis Gibson (R) since January 23, 2017 until November 8, 2021; Mike Schultz (R) from November 8, 2021
- House Minority Leader: Brian King (D) since January 26, 2015
- President of the Senate: J. Stuart Adams (R)
- Senate Majority Leader: Evan Vickers (R)
- Senate Minority Leader: Karen Mayne (D)

Structure
- Seats: 104 (75 Representatives & 29 Senators)
- Political groups: Majority: Republican (58); Minority: Democratic (17)
- Political groups: Majority: Republican (23); Minority: Democratic (6)
- Length of term: 2 years Representatives; 4 years Senators
- Authority: Article VI, Utah Constitution
- Salary: Reps: $117/day + per diem Senate:$130/day + per diem

Elections
- Last election: November 3, 2020 (15 Senate seats)
- Next election: November 8, 2022 (14+1 Senate seats)
- Redistricting: Legislative control

Meeting place
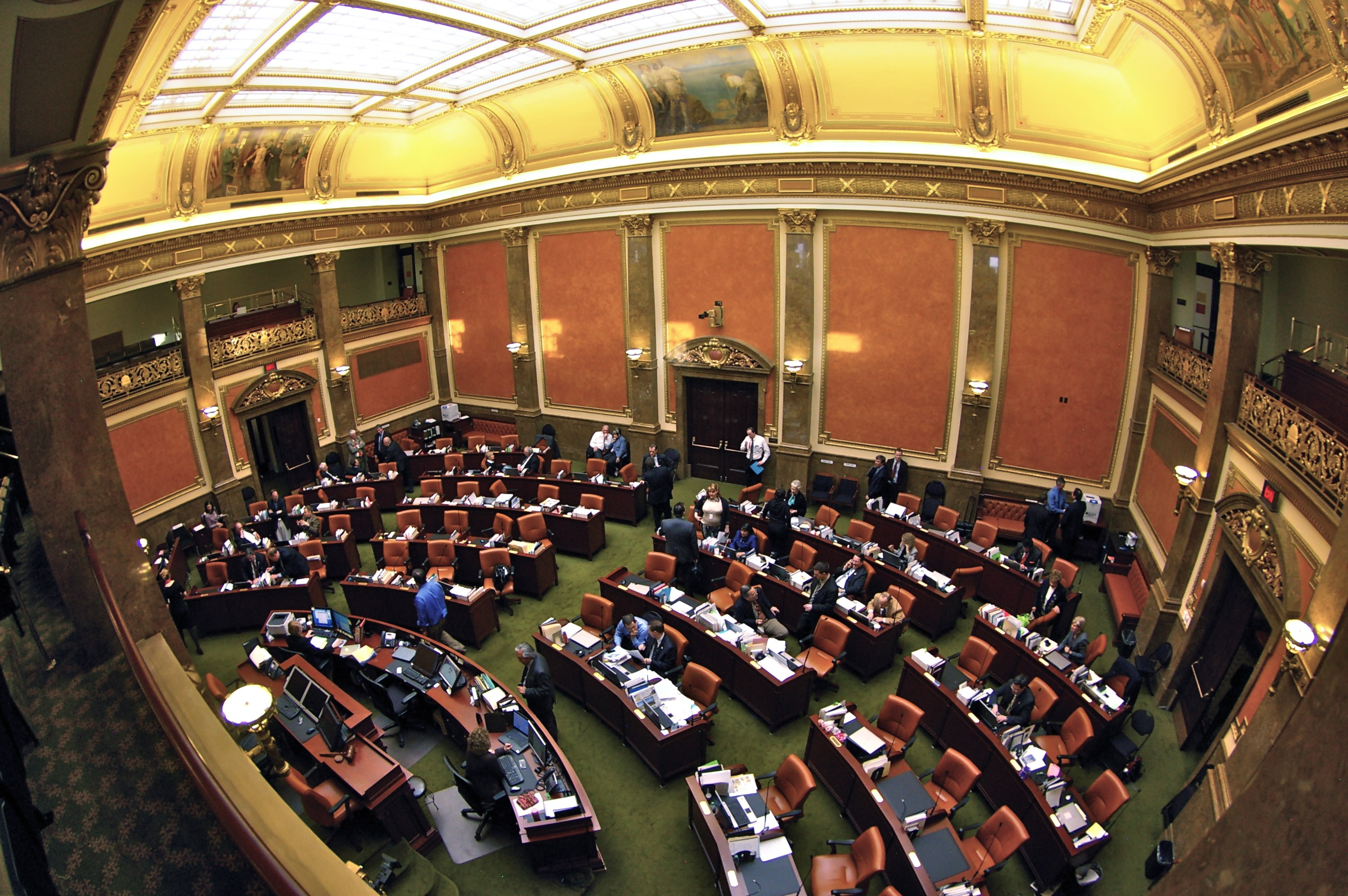
- Utah State Capitol; Salt Lake City, Utah

The 64th session of the Utah State Legislature sat from 2021 to 2022. House members were elected at the 2020 Utah House of Representatives election. Fifteen Senate members were elected at the 2020 Utah Senate election.

== Composition of the House of Representatives ==
=== Leadership in the House ===
Position	Name	Party	District
Speaker of the House	Brad Wilson	Republican	15
Majority Leader	Francis Gibson (until Nov. 8, 2021); Mike Schultz (from Nov. 8, 2021)	Republican	65 / 12
Majority Whip	Mike Schultz (until Nov. 8, 2021); Jefferson Moss (from Nov. 8, 2021)	Republican	12
Minority Leader	Brian King	Democratic	28
Minority Whip	Carol Spackman Moss	Democratic	37

=== Members of the 64th House of Representatives ===
District	Name	Party	Residence	Terms
1	Joel Ferry	Rep	Corinne	2018–
2	Jefferson Moss	Rep	Eagle Mountain	2016–
3	Mike Petersen	Rep	North Logan	2021–
4	Dan Johnson	Rep	Logan	2018–
5	Casey Snider	Rep	Paradise	2018–
6	Cory Maloy	Rep	Lehi	2016–
7	Ryan Wilcox	Rep	Ogden	2009–2015, 2021–
8	Steve Waldrip	Rep	Eden	2018–
9	Cal Musselman	Rep	West Haven	2018–
10	Rosemary Lesser	Dem	Ogden	2021*–
11	Kelly Miles	Rep	Ogden	2016–
12	Mike Schultz	Rep	Hooper	2014–
13	Paul Ray	Rep	Clearfield	2001-2003, 2004–2021
	Karen Peterson	Rep	Clearfield	2022*–
14	Karianne Lisonbee	Rep	Clearfield	2016–
15	Brad Wilson	Rep	Kaysville	2010–
16	Stephen Handy	Rep	Layton	2010*–
17	Stewart Barlow	Rep	Fruit Heights	2010–
18	Timothy Hawkes	Rep	Centerville	2014–
19	Raymond Ward	Rep	Bountiful	2014–
20	Melissa Garff Ballard	Rep	North Salt Lake	2018–
21	Douglas Sagers	Rep	Tooele	2010–
22	Clare Collard	Dem	Magna	2021–
23	Sandra Hollins	Dem	Salt Lake City	2014–
24	Jennifer Dailey-Provost	Dem	Salt Lake City	2018–
25	Joel Briscoe	Dem	Salt Lake City	2010*–
26	Angela Romero	Dem	Salt Lake City	2012–
27	Brady Brammer	Rep	Highland	2018–
28	Brian King	Dem	Salt Lake City	2008–
29	Matthew Gwynn	Rep	Farr West	2021–
30	Mike Winder	Rep	West Valley City	2011–2012, 2014–
31	Elizabeth Weight	Dem	West Valley City	2016–
32	Suzanne Harrison	Dem	Draper	2018–
33	Judy Weeks-Rohner	Rep	West Valley City	2021*–
34	Vacant	Vacant	Murray	
35	Mark Wheatley	Dem	Murray	2004–
36	Doug Owens	Dem	Salt Lake City	2021–
37	Carol Spackman Moss	Dem	Salt Lake City	2000–
38	Ashlee Matthews	Dem	West Jordan	2021–
39	James Dunnigan	Rep	Taylorsville	2002–
40	Stephanie Pitcher	Dem	Salt Lake City	2018–
41	Mark Strong	Rep	Riverton	2018–
42	Jordan Teuscher	Rep	South Jordan	2021–
43	Cheryl Acton	Rep	West Jordan	2017*–
44	Andrew Stoddard	Dem	Murray	2018–
45	Steve Eliason	Rep	Sandy	2010–
46	Gay Lynn Bennion	Dem	Cottonwood Heights	2021–
47	Ken Ivory	Rep	West Jordan	2011-2019, 2021-
48	Keven Stratton	Rep	Orem	2012*–
49	Robert Spendlove	Rep	Sandy	2014*–
50	Susan Pulsipher	Rep	South Jordan	2012–
51	Jeff Stenquist	Rep	Draper	2018–
52	Candice Pierucci	Rep	Salt Lake City	2019*–
53	Kera Birkeland	Rep	Morgan	2020*–
54	Mike Kohler	Rep	Midway	2021–
55	Scott Chew	Rep	Jensen	2014–
56	Kay Christofferson	Rep	Lehi	2012–
57	Jon Hawkins	Rep	Pleasant Grove	2018–
58	Steven J. Lund	Rep	Manti	2021–
59	Val Peterson	Rep	Orem	2010–
60	Nelson Abbott	Rep	Orem	2021–
61	Marsha Judkins	Rep	Provo	2018–
62	Travis Seegmiller	Rep	St. George	2018*–(2022)†
63	Adam Robertson	Rep	Provo	2018–
64	Norm Thurston	Rep	Provo	2014–
65	Francis Gibson (until Nov. 8, 2021); Stephen Whyte (appointed Nov. 9 2021)	Rep	Springville / Mapleton	2008–2021 2021-
66	Jeff Burton	Rep	Spanish Fork	2021–
67	Doug Welton	Rep	Payson	2021–
68	Merrill Nelson	Rep	Grantsville	2012–
69	Christine Watkins	Rep	Price	2016–
70	Carl Albrecht	Rep	Richfield	2016–
71	Bradley Last	Rep	St. George	2002–
72	Rex Shipp	Rep	Cedar City	2018–
73	Phil Lyman	Rep	Blanding	2018–
74	V. Lowry Snow	Rep	St. George	2012*–
75	Walt Brooks	Rep	St. George	2016–

* Representative was originally appointed to office.
†Travis Seegmiller announced his resignation from office, effective July 1, 2022.

== Composition of the Senate ==
=== Leadership, 64th session ===
Position	Name	Party	District
President of the Senate	J. Stuart Adams	Republican	22
Majority Leader	Evan Vickers	Republican	28
Majority Whip	Ann Millner	Republican	18
Assistant Majority Whip	Kirk Cullimore	Republican	9
Minority Leader	Karen Mayne	Democratic	5
Minority Whip	Luz Escamilla	Democratic	1
Assistant Minority Whip	Jani Iwamoto	Democratic	4

=== Members of the 64th Senate ===
District	Name	Party	First elected	Counties represented
1	Luz Escamilla	Dem	2008	Salt Lake
2	Derek Kitchen	Dem	2018	Salt Lake
3	Gene Davis	Dem	1998	Salt Lake
4	Jani Iwamoto	Dem	2014	Salt Lake
5	Karen Mayne	Dem	2008	Salt Lake
6	Wayne Harper	Rep	2012	Salt Lake
7	Mike McKell	Rep	2020	Utah
8	Kathleen Riebe	Dem	2018	Salt Lake
9	Kirk Cullimore Jr.	Rep	2018	Salt Lake
10	Lincoln Fillmore	Rep	2015	Salt Lake
11	Daniel McCay	Rep	2018	Salt Lake, Utah
12	Daniel Thatcher	Rep	2010	Salt Lake, Tooele
13	Jake Anderegg	Rep	2016	Salt Lake, Utah
14	Mike Kennedy	Rep	2020↑	Utah
15	Keith Grover	Rep	2018	Utah
16	Curt Bramble	Rep	2000	Utah, Wasatch
17	Scott Sandall	Rep	2018	Box Elder, Cache, Tooele
18	F. Ann Millner	Rep	2014	Davis, Morgan, Weber
19	John Johnson	Rep	2020	Morgan, Summit, Weber
20	D. Gregg Buxton	Rep	2016	Davis, Weber
21	Jerry Stevenson	Rep	2010↑	Davis
22	J. Stuart Adams	Rep	2009↑	Davis
23	Todd Weiler	Rep	2012↑	Davis, Salt Lake
24	Derrin Owens	Rep	2020	Garfield, Juab, Kane, Millard, Piute, Sanpete, Sevier, Utah, Wayne
25	Chris H. Wilson	Rep	2020	Cache, Rich
26	Ronald Winterton	Rep	2018	Daggett, Duchesne, Summit, Uintah, Wasatch
27	David Hinkins	Rep	2008	Carbon, Emery, Grand, San Juan, Utah, Wasatch
28	Evan Vickers	Rep	2012	Beaver, Iron, Washington
29	Don Ipson	Rep	2008	Washington

↑: Senator was originally appointed

== See also ==
- List of Utah state legislatures
