= 63rd Utah State Legislature =

63rd Session 2019-2020
- Utah State Legislature

Type
- Term limits: None

History
- New session started: January 28, 2019

Leadership
- Speaker of the House: Brad Wilson (R) since November 8, 2018
- House Majority Leader: Francis Gibson (R) since January 23, 2017
- House Minority Leader: Brian King (D) since January 26, 2015
- President of the Senate: J. Stuart Adams (R)
- Senate Majority Leader: Evan Vickers (R)
- Senate Minority Leader: Karen Mayne (D)

Structure
- Seats: 104 (75 Representatives & 29 Senators)
- Political groups: Majority: Republican (59); Minority: Democratic (16)
- Political groups: Majority: Republican (23); Minority: Democratic (6)
- Length of term: 2 years Reps 4 years Senators
- Authority: Article VI, Utah Constitution
- Salary: Reps: $117/day + per diem Senate:$130/day + per diem

Elections
- Last election: November 6, 2018 (14 seats)
- Next election: November 3, 2020 (15 seats)
- Redistricting: Legislative control

Meeting place
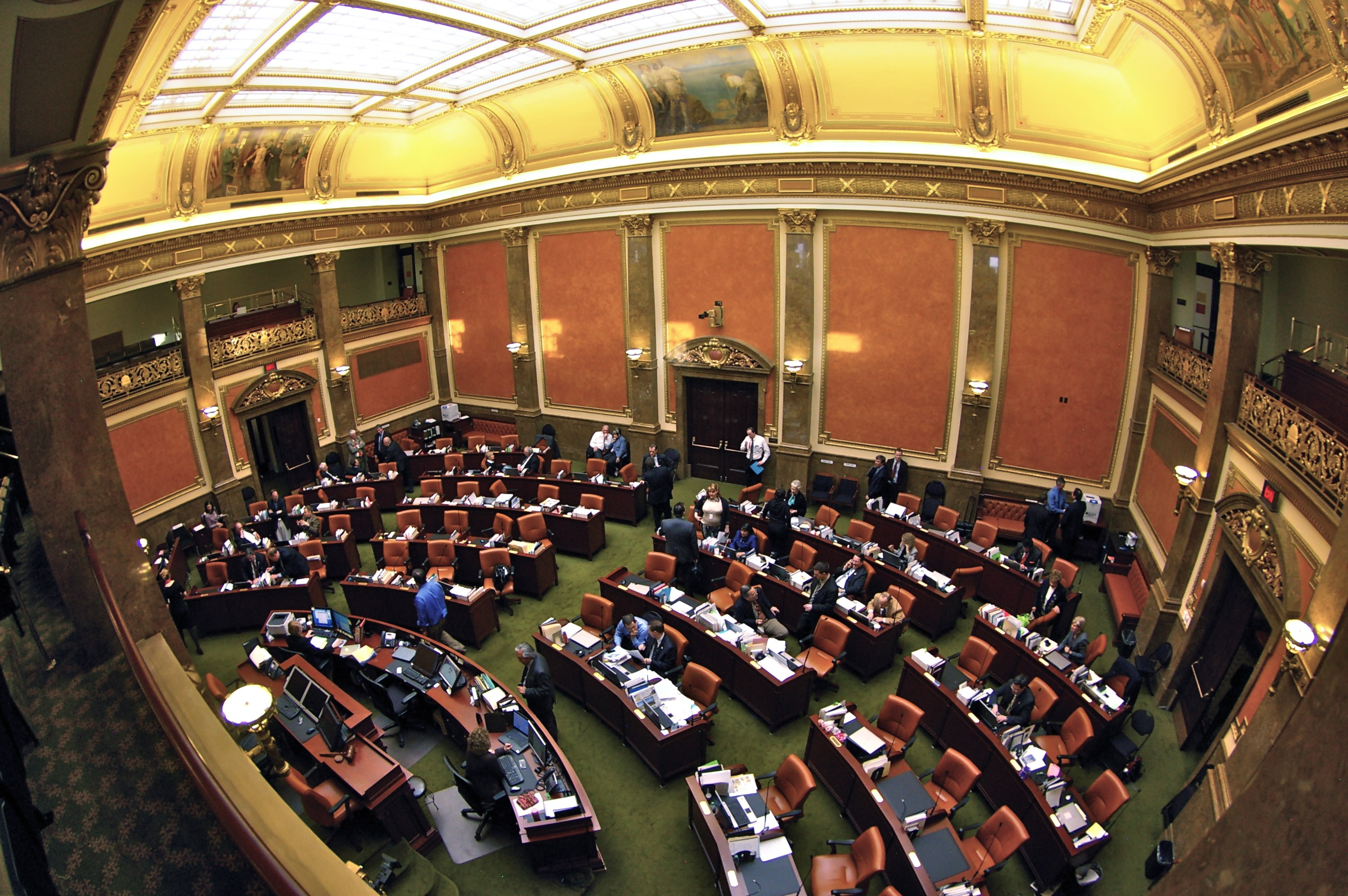
- House of Representatives Room Utah State Capitol; Salt Lake City, Utah
- State Senate Chamber; Utah State Capitol; Salt Lake City, Utah

The 63rd Session of the Utah State Legislature took place from 2019 to 2020 with a total of eight sessions, two constitutionally mandated general sessions (one each year) and six special sessions. While it's typical that the legislature has at least one special session per year, the high number of sessions was the result of the COVID-19 pandemic.

== Composition of the House of Representatives ==
=== Leadership in the People's House ===
Position	Name	Party	District
Speaker of the House	Brad Wilson	Republican	15
Majority Leader	Francis Gibson	Republican	65
Majority Whip	Mike Schultz	Republican	12
Minority Leader	Brian King	Democratic	28
Minority Whip	Carol Spackman Moss	Democratic	37

=== Members of the 63rd House of Representatives ===
District	Name	Party	Residence	First elected
1	Joel Ferry	Rep	Corinne	2018
2	Jefferson Moss	Rep	Eagle Mountain	2012
3	Val Potter	Rep	North Logan	2016
4	Dan Johnson	Rep	Logan	2018
5	Casey Snider	Rep	Paradise	2018
6	Cory Maloy	Rep	Lehi	2016
7	Kyle Andersen	Rep	North Ogden	2018↑
8	Steve Waldrip	Rep	Eden	2018
9	Cal Musselman	Rep	West Haven	2018
10	LaWanna Shurtliff	Dem	Ogden	2018 (1998–2008)
11	Kelly Miles	Rep	Ogden	2016
12	Mike Schultz	Rep	Hooper	2014
13	Paul Ray	Rep	Clearfield	2004 (2001–2003)
14	Karianne Lisonbee	Rep	Clearfield	2016
15	Brad Wilson	Rep	Kaysville	2010
16	Stephen Handy	Rep	Layton	2010↑
17	Stewart Barlow	Rep	Fruit Heights	2010
18	Timothy Hawkes	Rep	Centerville	2014
19	Raymond Ward	Rep	Bountiful	2014
20	Melissa Garff Ballard	Rep	North Salt Lake	2018
21	Douglas Sagers	Rep	Tooele	2010
22	Susan Duckworth	Dem	Magna	2008
23	Sandra Hollins	Dem	Salt Lake City	2014
24	Jennifer Dailey-Provost	Dem	Salt Lake City	2018
25	Joel Briscoe	Dem	Salt Lake City	2010↑
26	Angela Romero	Dem	Salt Lake City	2012
27	Brady Brammer	Rep	Highland	2018
28	Brian King	Dem	Salt Lake City	2008
29	Lee Perry	Rep	Perry	2010
30	Mike Winder	Rep	West Valley City	2014 (2011–2012)
31	Elizabeth Weight	Dem	West Valley City	2016
32	Suzanne Harrison	Dem	Draper	2018
33	Craig Hall	Rep	West Valley City	2012
34	Karen Kwan	Dem	Murray	2016
35	Mark Wheatley	Dem	Murray	2004
36	Patrice M. Arent	Dem	Salt Lake City	2010 (1997–2003)
37	Carol Spackman Moss	Dem	Salt Lake City	2000
38	Eric Hutchings	Rep	Kearns	2001↑
39	James Dunnigan	Rep	Taylorsville	2002
40	Stephanie Pitcher	Dem	Salt Lake City	2018
41	Mark Strong	Rep	Riverton	2018
42	Kim Coleman	Rep	West Jordan	2014
43	Cheryl Acton	Rep	West Jordan	2017↑
44	Andrew Stoddard	Dem	Murray	2018
45	Steve Eliason	Rep	Sandy	2010
46	Marie Poulson	Dem	Cottonwood Heights	2008
47	Steve Christiansen	Rep	West Jordan	↑
48	Keven Stratton	Rep	Orem	2012↑
49	Robert Spendlove	Rep	Sandy	2014↑
50	Susan Pulsipher	Rep	South Jordan	2012
51	Jeff Stenquist	Rep	Draper	2018
52	Candice Pierucci	Rep	Salt Lake City	↑
53	Logan Wilde	Rep	Croydon	2016
54	Tim Quinn	Rep	Heber	2016
55	Scott Chew	Rep	Jensen	2014
56	Kay Christofferson	Rep	Lehi	2012
57	Jon Hawkins	Rep	Pleasant Grove	2018
58	Derrin Owens	Rep	Fountain Green	2015↑
59	Val Peterson	Rep	Orem	2010
60	Brad Daw	Rep	Orem	2014
61	Marsha Judkins	Rep	Provo	2018
62	Travis Seegmiller	Rep		2018
63	Adam Robertson	Rep	Provo	2018
64	Norm Thurston	Rep	Provo	2014
65	Francis Gibson	Rep	Springville	2008
66	Mike McKell	Rep	Spanish Fork	2012
67	Mark Roberts	Rep	Santaquin	2012
68	Merrill Nelson	Rep	Grantsville	2012
69	Christine Watkins	Rep	Price	2016
70	Carl Albrecht	Rep	Richfield	2016
71	Bradley Last	Rep	St. George	2002
72	Rex Shipp	Rep	Cedar City	2018
73	Phil Lyman	Rep	Kanab	2018
74	V. Lowry Snow	Rep	St. George	2012↑
75	Walt Brooks	Rep	St. George	2016

↑Representative was originally appointed into office.

== Composition of the Senate ==
=== Leadership of the Senate ===
Position	Name	Party	District
President of the Senate	J. Stuart Adams	Republican	22
Majority Leader	Evan Vickers	Republican	28
Majority Whip	Dan Hemmert	Republican	14
Assistant Majority Whip	F. Ann Millner	Republican	18
Minority Leader	Karen Mayne	Democratic	5
Minority Whip	Luz Escamilla	Democratic	1
Assistant Minority Whip	Jani Iwamoto	Democratic	4

=== Members of the 63rd Senate ===
District	Name	Party	First elected	Counties Represented	Margin (Note: Republican margin in last election)
1	Luz Escamilla	Dem	2008	Salt Lake	-29.4 (Note: 2020)
2	Derek Kitchen	Dem	2018	Salt Lake	-53.4 (Note: 2018)
3	Gene Davis	Dem	1998	Salt Lake	-40 (Note: 2018)
4	Jani Iwamoto	Dem	2014	Salt Lake	-34.2 (Note: 2018)
5	Karen Mayne	Dem	2008	Salt Lake	-37.4 (Note: 2018)
6	Wayne Harper	Rep	2012	Salt Lake	11.2 (Note: 2020)
7	Deidre Henderson	Rep	2012	Utah	
8	Kathleen Riebe	Dem	2018	Salt Lake	-13.2 (Note: 2020)
9	Kirk Cullimore Jr.	Rep	2018	Salt Lake	31.4 (Note: 2018, against a United Utah candidate)
10	Lincoln Fillmore	Rep	2015	Salt Lake	30.4 (Note: 2020)
11	Daniel McCay	Rep	2018	Salt Lake, Utah	35.4 (Note: 2018)
12	Daniel Thatcher	Rep	2010	Salt Lake, Tooele	5.2 (Note: 2018)
13	Jake Anderegg	Rep	2016	Tooele, Utah	100 (Note: 2020)
14	Dan Hemmert	Rep	2016↑	Utah	100 (Note: 2020)
15	Keith Grover	Rep	2018	Utah	63.4 (Note: 2018, against a United Utah candidate)
16	Curt Bramble	Rep	2000	Utah	100 (Note: 2020)
17	Scott Sandall	Rep	2018	Box Elder, Cache, Tooele	55.6 (Note: 2018)
18	F. Ann Millner	Rep	2014	Davis, Weber	33.8 (Note: 2018)
19	Allen M. Christensen	Rep	2004	Morgan, Summit, Weber	
20	D. Gregg Buxton	Rep	2016	Weber	100 (Note: 2020)
21	Jerry Stevenson	Rep	2010↑	Davis	43.4 (Note: 2018)
22	J. Stuart Adams	Rep	2009↑	Davis	100 (Note: 2018)
23	Todd Weiler	Rep	2012↑	Davis	87.8 (Note: 2020, against a write-in candidate)
24	Ralph Okerlund	Rep	2008	Juab, Piute, Sanpete, Sevier, Tooele, Wayne	
25	Lyle W. Hillyard	Rep	1984	Cache, Rich	
26	Ronald Winterton	Rep	2018	Daggett, Duchesne, Summit, Uintah, Wasatch	27.8 (Note: 2018)
27	David Hinkins	Rep	2008	Carbon, Emery, Grand, San Juan, Utah	100 (Note: 2020)
28	Evan Vickers	Rep	2012	Beaver, Garfield, Iron, Kane, Millard, Washington	58.2 (Note: 2018)
29	Don Ipson	Rep	2008	Washington	54 (Note: 2020)

↑: Senator was originally appointed

== See also ==
- Utah State Legislative districts
- Utah State House of Representatives
- Utah State Senate
- List of Utah State Legislatures
- Elections in Utah
- Utah Republican Party
- Utah Democratic Party
