= 2024 Utah Senate election =

- November 5, 2024

15 of the 29 seats in the Utah State Senate 15 seats needed for a majority
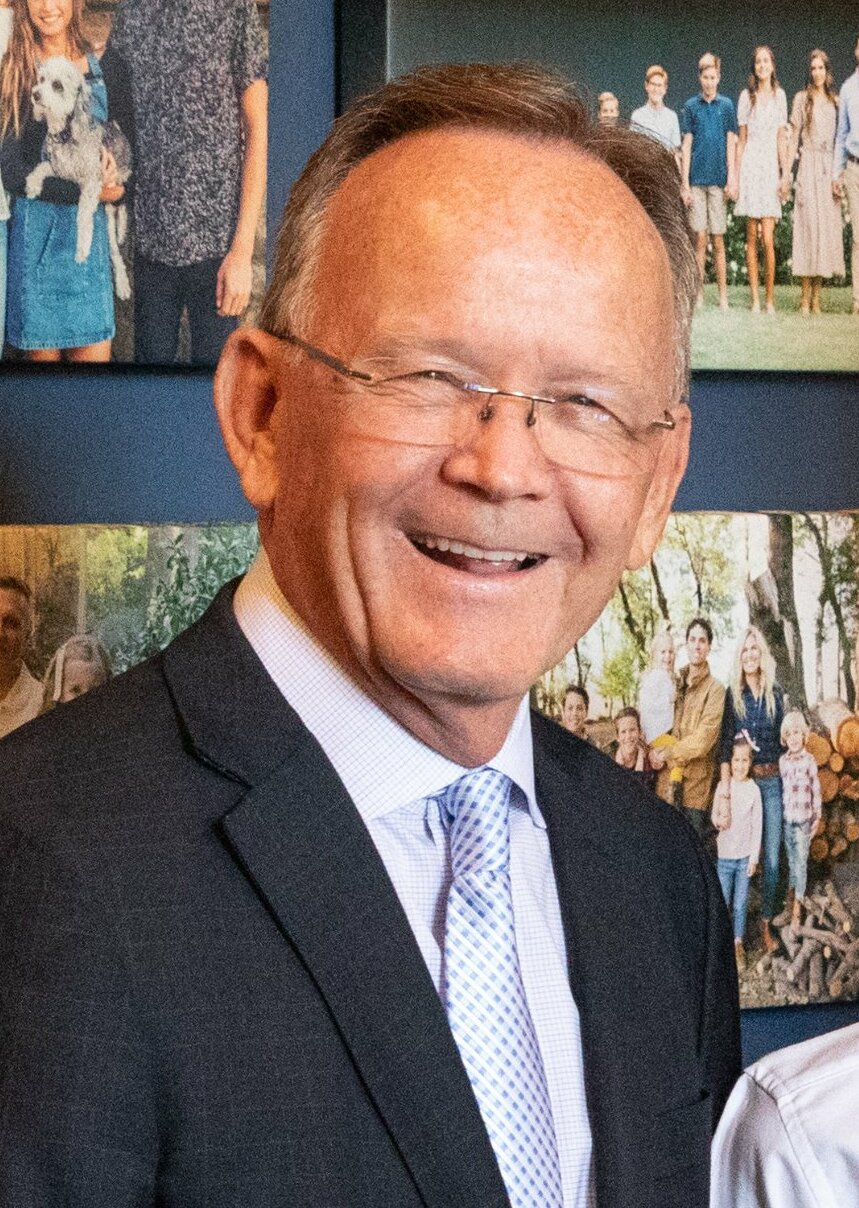

	Majority party	Minority party
Leader	Stuart Adams	Luz Escamilla
Party	Republican	Democratic
Leader's seat	7th–Salt Lake	10th–Salt Lake
Last election	11 seats, 63.59%	4 seats, 31.41%
Seats before	23	6
Seats won	12	3
Seats after	23	6
Seat change	Steady	Steady
Popular vote	467,679	68.65%
Percentage	68.65%	22.02%
Swing	▲5.06 pp	▼9.39 pp
	Third party
Party	Independent
Last election	0 seats, 0.04%
Seats before	0
Seats won	0
Seats after	0
Popular vote	48,525
Percentage	9.07%
Swing	▲9.03 pp
- Republican hold Democratic hold No election 40–50% 50–60% 60–70% 70–80% >90% 50–60%
Senate President before election
Stuart Adams
Republican
Elected Senate President
Stuart Adams
Republican

The 2024 Utah Senate election was held on November 5, 2024, as part of the biennial 2024 United States elections. 15 of the 29 seats in the Utah Senate were up for election to the 66th Legislature. The filing deadline for candidates was January 8, 2024. Primary elections were held on June 24, 2024. The elections coincided with elections for other offices in Utah, including for Governor, US Senate, US House, and the Utah House.

== Retirements ==
=== Republicans ===
- District 4: D. Gregg Buxton retired.
- District 24: Curt Bramble retired.

== Predictions ==
Source	Ranking	As of
CNalysis	Solid R	March 26, 2024

=== Competitive races ===
This table lists any legislative seat not rated as Solid D or Solid R by at least one election prediction agency.

Seat	CNalysis
District 8	Lean R
District 10	Very Likely D
District 12	Likely D
District 15	Very Likely D
District 16	Very Likely R

== Summary ==
Summary of the 2024 Utah Senate election results
Party	Candidates	Votes	%	Seats				
Party	Candidates	Votes	%	Before 65th Leg.	Up	Won	After 66th Leg.	+/–
Republican	15	467,679	68.65%	23	12	12	23	Steady
Democratic	9	150,013	22.02%	6	3	3	6	Steady
Independents	5	48,525	9.07%	0	0	0	0	Steady
Constitution	1	1,736	0.25%	0	0	0	0	Steady
Total		681,239	100.0%	29	15		29	Steady

Popular vote
Republican	68.65%
Democratic	22.02%
Independents	9.07%
Constitution	0.25%

Seats won
Republican	86.67%
Democratic	13.33%

Total senate seats
Republican	79.31%
Democratic	20.69%

=== Seat-by-seat ===
Position	Incumbent				Candidates ▌Unaffiliated ▌Constitution ▌Democratic ▌Utah Forward ▌Republican
Position	Member	Party	First elected	Status	Candidates ▌Unaffiliated ▌Constitution ▌Democratic ▌Utah Forward ▌Republican
SD 2	Chris H. Wilson	Republican	2020	Incumbent running.	▌Nancy Huntly; ▌Chris H. Wilson
SD 3	John D. Johnson	Republican	2020	Incumbent running.	▌Stacy Bernal; ▌John D. Johnson
SD 4	D. Gregg Buxton	Republican	2016	Incumbent retiring.	▌Cal Musselman
SD 8	Todd Weiler	Republican	2012 (appointed)	Incumbent running.	▌Aaron Wiley; ▌Laren C. Livingston; ▌Alisa Cox Van Langeveld; ▌Todd Weiler
SD 10	Luz Escamilla	Democratic	2008	Incumbent running.	▌Luz Escamilla; ▌Kyle W. Erb
SD 12 (special)	Karen Kwan	Democratic	2023 (appointed)	Incumbent running.	▌Karen Kwan; ▌Judy Weeks-Rohner
SD 15	Kathleen Riebe	Democratic	2018	Incumbent running.	▌Kathleen Riebe; ▌Scott Cuthbertson; ▌Amber Shill; ▌Steve Aste
SD 16	Wayne Harper	Republican	2012	Incumbent running.	▌Monnica Manuel; ▌Christina Boggess; ▌Wayne Harper
SD 17	Lincoln Fillmore	Republican	2016 (appointed)	Incumbent running.	▌Lincoln Fillmore; ▌Pamela Bloom
SD 22	Heidi Balderree	Republican	2023 (appointed)	Incumbent running.	▌Heidi Balderree; ▌Garret Cammans; ▌Emily Lockhart
SD 24	Curt Bramble	Republican	2020	Incumbent retiring.	▌David Hinckley; ▌Lori Andersen Spruance; ▌Keven J. Stratton
SD 25	Mike McKell	Republican	2020	Incumbent running.	▌Alan Dale Hansen; ▌Mike McKell
SD 26	David Hinkins	Republican	2008	Incumbent running.	▌Oran Stainbrook; ▌David Hinkins; ▌Corbin David Frost
SD 27	Derrin Owens	Republican	2020	Incumbent running.	▌Derrin Owens
SD 29	Don Ipson	Republican	2016 (appointed)	Incumbent running.	▌Deidra Ritchhart; ▌Don Ipson; ▌Chad E. Bennion

=== Close races ===
District	Winner	Margin
District 3	Republican	15.06%
District 8	Republican	14.81%
District 10	Democratic	13.08%
District 12	Democratic	12.94%
District 15	Democratic	14.08%
District 16	Republican	14.94%

== SD 2 ==
=== Democratic primary ===
Candidate

- Nancy Huntly, ecologist and nominee for state senate district 25 in 2020

=== Republican primary ===
Candidate

- Chris H. Wilson, incumbent senator

=== General election ===
Utah's 2nd Senate District General Election, 2024
Party	Candidate	Votes	%
Democratic	Nancy Huntly	14,262	30.18%
Republican	Chris H. Wilson	32,995	69.82%
Total votes		47,257	100%

== SD 3 ==
=== Democratic primary ===
Candidate

- Stacy Bernal

=== Republican primary ===
Candidate

- John D. Johnson, incumbent state senator

=== General election ===
Utah's 3rd Senate District General Election, 2024
Party	Candidate	Votes	%
Democratic	Stacy Bernal	20,824	42.47%
Republican	John D. Johnson	28,213	57.53%
Total votes		49,037	100%

== SD 4 ==
Incumbent state senator D. Gregg Buxton is not seeking re-election. State representative from the 9th district, Cal Musselman, is running unopposed in both the Republican primary and the general election.

=== Republican primary ===
Candidate

- Cal Musselman, state representative from the 9th district

=== General election ===
Utah's 4th Senate District General Election, 2024
Party	Candidate	Votes	%
Republican	Cal Musselman	Unopposed	
Total votes		38,687	100%

== SD 8 ==
=== Constitution primary ===
Candidate

- Laren Livingston

=== Democratic primary ===
Candidate

- Aaron Wiley

=== Republican primary ===
Candidates

- Ronald Mortensen
- Brady Tracy
- Todd Weiler, incumbent state senator

Utah's 15th Senate District Republican primary, 2024
Party	Candidate	Votes	%
Republican	Todd Weiler	10,772	68.45%
Republican	Ronald Mortensen	4,965	31.55%
Total votes		15,737	100%

=== Independent ===
Candidate

- Alisa Langeveld

=== General election ===
Utah's 8th Senate District General Election, 2024
Party	Candidate	Votes	%
Republican	Todd Weiler	24,142	47.12%
Democratic	Aaron Wiley	16,555	32.31%
Independent	Alisa Langeveld	8,807	17.19%
Constitution	Laren Livingston	1,736	3.39%
Total votes		51,240	100%

== SD 10 ==
=== Democratic primary ===
Candidate

- Luz Escamilla, incumbent state senator

=== Republican primary ===
Candidate

- Kyle Erb

=== General election ===
Utah's 10th Senate District General Election, 2024
Party	Candidate	Votes	%
Democratic	Luz Escamilla	16,504	56.54%
Republican	Kyle Erb	12,688	43.46%
Total votes		29,192	100%

== SD 12 ==
=== Democratic primary ===
Candidate

- Karen Kwan, incumbent state senator

=== Republican primary ===
Candidate

- Judy Weeks-Rohner, state representative from the 30th district

=== General election ===
Utah's 12th Senate District General Election, 2024
Party	Candidate	Votes	%
Democratic	Karen Kwan	18,424	56.47%
Republican	Judy Weeks-Rohner	14,201	43.53%
Total votes		32,625	100%

== SD 15 ==
=== Democratic primary ===
Candidate

- Kathleen Riebe, incumbent state senator

=== Republican primary ===
Candidates

- Steve Aste
- Scott Cuthbertson
- Amber Shill
- Edward Bennett (withdrew)

Utah's 16th Senate District Republican convention 1st round, 2024
Party	Candidate	Votes	%
Republican	Steve Aste	39	37.14%
Republican	Amber Shill	21	20.00%
Republican	Scott Cuthbertson	45	42.86%
Total votes		105	

Utah's 16th Senate District Republican convention 2nd round, 2024
Party	Candidate	Votes	%
Republican	Steve Aste	42	40.38%
Republican	Scott Cuthbertson	62	59.62%
Total votes		104	

Utah's 15th Senate District Republican primary, 2024
Party	Candidate	Votes	%
Republican	Steve Aste		
Republican	Scott Cuthbertson		
Total votes			

=== General election ===
Utah's 15th Senate District General Election, 2024
Party	Candidate	Votes	%
Democratic	Kathleen Ann Riebe	27,103	57.04%
Republican	Scott Cuthbertson	20,414	42.96%
Total votes		47,517	100%

== SD 16 ==
=== Republican primary ===
Candidates

- Wayne Harper, incumbent state senator
- Christina Boggess
- Jonathan Filder (eliminated at convention)

Utah's 16th Senate District Republican convention 1st round, 2024
Party	Candidate	Votes	%
Republican	Wayne Harper	54	41.22%
Republican	Christina Boggess	62	47.33%
Republican	Jonathan Filder	15	11.45%
Total votes		131	

Utah's 16th Senate District Republican convention 2nd round, 2024
Party	Candidate	Votes	%
Republican	Wayne Harper	60	46.15%
Republican	Christina Boggess	70	53.85%
Total votes		130	

Utah's 16th Senate District Republican primary, 2024
Party	Candidate	Votes	%
Republican	Wayne Harper		
Republican	Christina Boggess		
Total votes			

=== Independent ===
Candidate

- Monnica Manuel

=== General Election ===
Utah's 16th Senate District General Election, 2024
Party	Candidate	Votes	%
Republican	Wayne Harper	24,923	57.47%
Independent	Monnica Manuel	18,447	42.53%
Total votes		43,370	100%

== SD 17 ==
=== Republican primary ===
Candidates

- Lincoln Filmore, incumbent state senator
- Janalee Tobias (eliminated at convention)

Utah's 16th Senate District Republican convention, 2024
Party	Candidate	Votes	%
Republican	Lincoln Fillmore	116	65.17%
Republican	Janalee Tobias	62	34.83%
Total votes		178	

=== Independent ===
Candidate

- Pamela Bloom

=== General Election ===
Utah's 17th Senate District General Election, 2024
Party	Candidate	Votes	%
Republican	Lincoln Fillmore	34,072	63.89%
Independent	Pamela Bloom	19,259	36.11%
Total votes		53,331	100%

== SD 22 ==
No independent or Democratic candidate filed before the deadline.

=== Republican primary ===
Candidates

- Heidi Balderree, incumbent state senator
- Garret Cammans
- Emily Lockhart

Utah's 22nd Senate District Republican primary, 2024
Party	Candidate	Votes	%
Republican	Heidi Balderree		
Republican	Garret Cammans		
Republican	Emily Lockhart		
Total votes			

=== General Election ===
Utah's 22nd Senate District General Election, 2024
Party	Candidate	Votes	%
Republican	Heidi Balderree	43,951	100%
Total votes		43,951	100%

== SD 24 ==
=== Utah Forward primary ===
Candidate

- David Hinckley

=== Republican primary ===
Candidates

- Curt Bramble, incumbent state senator
- Brad Daw, former state representative from the 60th district
- Dan Hemmert, former senator from the 14th district
- Keven Stratton, state representative from the 58th district

Utah's 24th Senate District Republican primary, 2024
Party	Candidate	Votes	%
Republican	Curt Bramble		
Republican	Brad Daw		
Republican	Dan Hemmert		
Republican	Keven Stratton		
Total votes			

=== General Election ===
Utah's 24th Senate District General Election, 2024
Party	Candidate	Votes	%
Republican	Keven Stratton	23,807	66.14%
Independent	Lori Andersen Spruance	12,186	33.86%
Total votes		35,993	100%

== SD 25 ==
=== Democratic primary ===
Candidate

- Alan Hansen

=== Republican primary ===
Candidates

- Mike McKell, incumbent state senator
- Michael Cook (disqualified)

Concern over Michael Cook's candidacy initially occurred in January 2024 as the Lieutenant Governor's Office found that Cook had incorrectly filled out the candidate filing form, and that the Utah County Clerk had improperly amended Cook's form after the filing deadline. After the Utah County Republican Party leadership voted to allow Cook to participate in party events despite Cook's filing form indicating he was only going to seek candidacy via signatures, Mike McKell threatened a lawsuit against the Utah County Republican Party and the Utah County Clerk. Cook and the County Party leadership were notified by the Lieutenant Governor's Office would not be placed on the ballot if he were nominated at convention. Cook failed to obtain the necessary signatures to be placed on the ballot, and was also charged with criminal trespass and resisting arrest after attempting to solicit signatures inside a local post office.

=== General Election ===
Utah's 25th Senate District General Election, 2024
Party	Candidate	Votes	%
Republican	Mike McKell	38,597	78.74%
Democratic	Alan Hansen	10,420	21.26%
Total votes		49,017	100%

== SD 26 ==
=== Democratic primary ===
Candidate

- Corbin Frost

=== Republican primary ===
Candidate

- David Hinkins, incumbent state senator

=== General election ===
Utah's 26th Senate District General Election, 2024
Party	Candidate	Votes	%
Democratic	Corbin Frost	12,932	24.30%
Republican	David Hinkins	37,182	69.86%
Independent	Oran Stainbrook	3,112	5.85%
Total votes		53,226	100%

== SD 27 ==
The incumbent state senator, Derrin Owens, is running unopposed in both the Republican primary and the general election.

=== Republican primary ===
Candidate

- Derrin Owens, incumbent state senator

=== General election ===
Utah's 27th Senate District General Election, 2024
Party	Candidate	Votes	%
Republican	Derrin Owens	51,664	100%
Total votes		51,664	100%

== SD 29 ==
=== Democratic primary ===
Candidate

- Deidra Ritchhart

=== Republican primary ===
Candidates

- Chad Bennion
- Cory Green
- Don Ipson, incumbent state senator

Utah's 29th Senate District Republican primary, 2024
Party	Candidate	Votes	%
Republican	Chad Bennion		
Republican	Cory Green		
Republican	Don Ipson		
Total votes			

=== General election ===
Utah's 29th Senate District General Election, 2024
Party	Candidate	Votes	%
Democratic	Deidra Ritchhart	12,989	23.56%
Republican	Don Ipson	42,143	76.44%
Total votes		55,132	100%

== See also ==
- 2024 Utah gubernatorial election
- 2024 United States Senate election in Utah
- 2024 United States House of Representatives elections in Utah
