= 2022 Utah Senate election =

- November 8, 2022

15 of the 29 seats in the Utah State Senate 15 seats needed for a majority
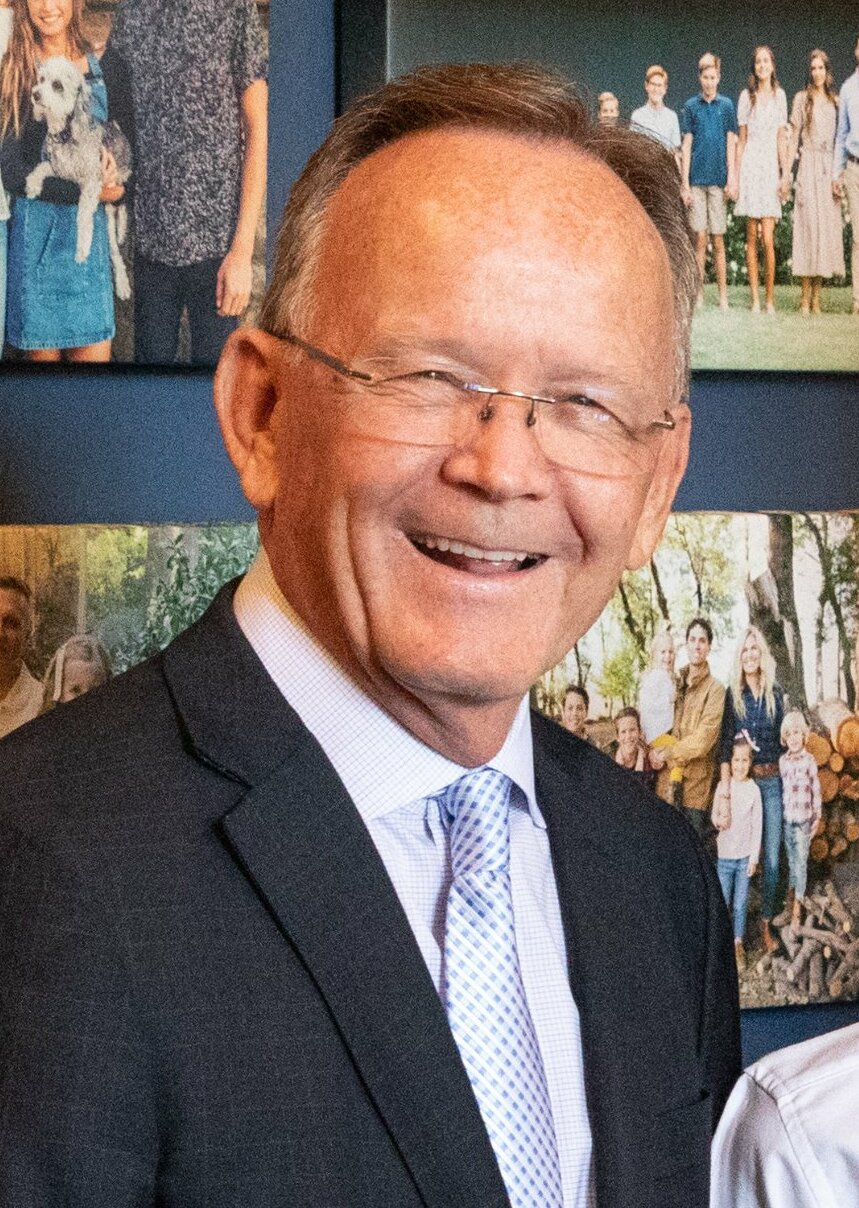

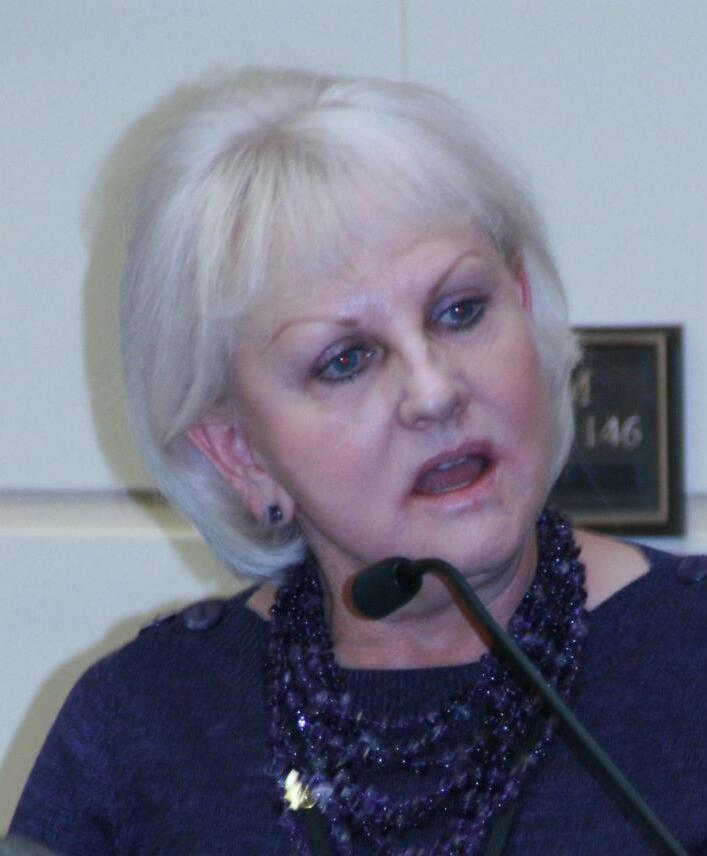
| | Majority party | Minority party |
|---|---|---|
| Leader | Stuart Adams | Karen Mayne |
| Party | Republican | Democratic |
| Leader's seat | 7th (Note: Redistricted from district 22 to 7.) | 12th (Note: Redistricted from district 5 to 12.) |
| Seats before | 23 | 6 |
| Seats after | 23 | 6 |
| Seat change | Steady | Steady |
| Popular vote | 305,987 | 151,169 |
| Percentage | 63.59% | 31.41% |
- Republican hold Democratic hold No election 50–60% 60–70% 70–80% 80–90% >90% 60–70% 70–80% >90%
Senate President before election
Stuart Adams
Republican
Elected Senate President
Stuart Adams
Republican

The 2022 Utah Senate elections were held on November 8, 2022, as part of the biennial 2022 United States elections. 15 of the 29 seats in the Utah Senate were up for election. The Democratic Convention was held on April 9, 2022. The Republican Convention was held on April 23, 2022. Primary elections were held on June 28, 2022. The elections coincided with elections for other offices in Utah, including the US Senate, US House, and the Utah House.

Following the 2022 elections, Republicans maintained their supermajority with an unchanged 23-to-6 member advantage over Democrats.

== Retirements ==
=== Democrats ===
1. District 4: Jani Iwamoto (Note: Was up for election in 2022. Retired.) retired.

== Predictions ==
| Source | Ranking | As of |
|---|---|---|
| Sabato's Crystal Ball | Safe R | May 19, 2022 |

== Defeated incumbents ==
=== Primary election ===
1. District 9: Democrat Derek Kitchen (Note: Redistricted from district 2 to 9. Was up for election in 2022. Lost in the Democratic primary on June 28.) lost renomination to Jennifer Plumb.
2. District 13: Democrat Gene Davis (Note: Redistricted from district 3 to 13. Was up for election in 2022. Lost in the Democratic primary on June 28.) lost renomination to Nate Blouin.

== Holdover senators ==
Due to redistricting changing the districts for most incumbents, fourteen holdover Senators were not up for election in 2022, yet their district boundaries and numbers did change. These holdover Senators in 2022 were:

1. District 2: Republican Chris H. Wilson (Note: Redistricted from district 25 to 2. Was not up for re-election in 2022.)
2. District 3: Republican John Johnson (Note: Redistricted from district 19 to 3. Was not up for re-election in 2022.)
3. District 4: Republican D. Gregg Buxton (Note: Redistricted from district 20 to 4. Was not up for re-election in 2022.)
4. District 8: Republican Todd Weiler (Note: Redistricted from district 23 to 8. Was not up for re-election in 2022.)
5. District 10: Democrat Luz Escamilla (Note: Redistricted from district 1 to 10. Was not up for re-election in 2022.)
6. District 15: Democrat Kathleen Riebe (Note: Redistricted from district 8 to 15. Was not up for re-election in 2022.)
7. District 16: Republican Wayne Harper (Note: Redistricted from district 6 to 16. Was not up for re-election in 2022.)
8. District 17: Republican Lincoln Fillmore (Note: Redistricted from district 10 to 17. Was not up for re-election in 2022.)
9. District 22: Republican Jake Anderegg (Note: Redistricted from district 13 to 22. Was not up for re-election in 2022.)
10. District 24: Republican Curt Bramble (Note: Redistricted from district 16 to 24. Was not up for re-election in 2022.)
11. District 25: Republican Mike McKell (Note: Redistricted from district 7 to 25. Was not up for re-election in 2022.)
12. District 26: Republican David Hinkins (Note: Redistricted from district 27 to 26. Was not up for re-election in 2022.)
13. District 27: Republican Derrin Owens (Note: Redistricted from district 24 to 27. Was not up for re-election in 2022.)
14. District 29: Republican Don Ipson (Note: District number remained unchanged in district 29. Was not up for re-election in 2022.)

== Results ==
Summary of the November 8, 2022 Utah State Senate election results
| Party | Candidates | Votes | | Seats | | | | |
| Party | Candidates | No. | % | Before | Up | Won | After | +/– |
|---|---|---|---|---|---|---|---|---|
| Republican | 13 | 305,987 | 63.59% | 23 | 10 | 8 | 23 | Steady |
| Democratic | 8 | 151,169 | 31.41% | 6 | 4 | 6 | 6 | Steady |
| United Utah | 5 | 20,077 | 4.17% | 0 | 0 | 0 | 0 | Steady |
| Libertarian Party | 1 | 3,766 | 0.78% | 0 | 0 | 0 | 0 | Steady |
| Independent | 1 (write-in) | 213 | 0.04% | 0 | 0 | 0 | 0 | Steady |
| Total | | 481,212 | 100.00% | 29 | 14 | 14 | 29 | Steady |
Source: Utah Elections Results

Popular vote
| Republican | 63.59% |
| Democratic | 31.41% |
| United Utah | 4.17% |
| Libertarian | 0.78% |
| Independent | 0.04% |

Senate seats
| Republican | 86.67% |
| Democratic | 13.33% |

== Close races ==
| District | Winner | Margin |
|---|---|---|
| District 14 | Democratic | 14.46% |

== Summary of results by State Senate district ==
- Note: Incumbent senators with gray backgrounds were not up for election in 2022; however, they may have been redistricted to new district numbers.
- Elections were held in 2022 in districts 1, 5, 6, 7, 9, 11, 12, 13, 14, 18, 19, 20, 21, 23, and 28.

| State Senate District | Incumbent | Party | Elected Senator | Party |
|---|---|---|---|---|
| 1 | Luz Escamilla | Dem | Scott Sandall (Note: Redistricted from district 17 to 1. Was up for election in 2022.) | Rep |
| 2 | Derek Kitchen | Dem | Chris H. Wilson | Rep |
| 3 | Gene Davis | Dem | John Johnson | Rep |
| 4 | Jani Iwamoto | Dem | D. Gregg Buxton | Rep |
| 5 | Karen Mayne (Note: Redistricted from district 5 to 12. Was up for election in 2022.) | Dem | F. Ann Millner (Note: Redistricted from district 18 to 5. Was up for election in 2022.) | Rep |
| 6 | Wayne Harper | Rep | Jerry Stevenson (Note: Redistricted from district 21 to 6. Was up for election in 2022.) | Rep |
| 7 | Mike McKell | Rep | J. Stuart Adams (Note: Redistricted from district 22 to 7. Was up for election in 2022.) | Rep |
| 8 | Kathleen Riebe | Dem | Todd Weiler | Rep |
| 9 | Kirk Cullimore Jr. (Note: Redistricted from district 9 to 19. Was up for election in 2022.) | Rep | Jennifer Plumb | Dem |
| 10 | Lincoln Fillmore | Rep | Luz Escamilla | Dem |
| 11 | Daniel McCay (Note: Redistricted from district 11 to 18. Was up for election in 2022.) | Rep | Daniel Thatcher (Note: Redistricted from district 12 to 11. Was up for election in 2022.) | Rep |
| 12 | Daniel Thatcher | Rep | Karen Mayne | Dem |
| 13 | Jake Anderegg | Rep | Nate Blouin | Dem |
| 14 | Mike Kennedy (Note: Redistricted from district 14 to 21. Was up for election in 2022.) | Rep | Stephanie Pitcher | Dem |
| 15 | Keith Grover (Note: Redistricted from district 15 to 23. Was up for election in 2022.) | Rep | Kathleen Riebe | Dem |
| 16 | Curt Bramble | Rep | Wayne Harper | Rep |
| 17 | Scott Sandall | Rep | Lincoln Fillmore | Rep |
| 18 | F. Ann Millner | Rep | Daniel McCay | Rep |
| 19 | John Johnson | Rep | Kirk Cullimore Jr. | Rep |
| 20 | D. Gregg Buxton | Rep | Ronald Winterton (Note: Redistricted from district 26 to 20. Was up for election in 2022.) | Rep |
| 21 | Jerry Stevenson | Rep | Mike Kennedy | Rep |
| 22 | J. Stuart Adams | Rep | Jake Anderegg | Rep |
| 23 | Todd Weiler | Rep | Keith Grover | Rep |
| 24 | Derrin Owens | Rep | Curt Bramble | Rep |
| 25 | Chris H. Wilson | Rep | Mike McKell | Rep |
| 26 | Ronald Winterton | Rep | David Hinkins | Rep |
| 27 | David Hinkins | Rep | Derrin Owens | Rep |
| 28 | Evan Vickers | Rep | Evan Vickers (Note: District number remained unchanged in district 28. Was up for election in 2022.) | Rep |
| 29 | Don Ipson | Rep | Don Ipson | Rep |

Election results source:

== Detailed results ==
Election results source:

=== District 1 ===
Utah's 1st Senate District general election, 2022
| Party | Candidate | Votes | % |
|---|---|---|---|
| Republican | Scott Sandall (incumbent) | 32,597 | 100.00% |
| Total votes | | 32,597 | 100.00% |
| Republican hold | | | |

=== District 5 ===
Utah's 5th Senate District general election, 2022
| Party | Candidate | Votes | % |
|---|---|---|---|
| Republican | F. Ann Millner (incumbent) | 19,336 | 64.39% |
| Democratic | Michael Blodgett | 10,695 | 35.61% |
| Total votes | | 30,031 | 100.00% |
| Republican hold | | | |

=== District 6 ===
Utah's 6th Senate District general election, 2022
| Party | Candidate | Votes | % |
|---|---|---|---|
| Republican | Jerry Stevenson (incumbent) | 26,670 | 100.00% |
| Total votes | | 26,670 | 100.00% |
| Republican hold | | | |

=== District 7 ===
Utah's 7th Senate District general election, 2022
| Party | Candidate | Votes | % |
|---|---|---|---|
| Republican | J. Stuart Adams (incumbent) | 27,309 | 71.94% |
| United Utah | Kimberly Wagner | 10,651 | 28.06% |
| Total votes | | 37,960 | 100.00% |
| Republican hold | | | |

=== District 9 ===
Utah's 9th Senate District general election, 2022
| Party | Candidate | Votes | % |
|---|---|---|---|
| Democratic | Jen Plumb | 32,817 | 99.36% |
| Independent | Vance Hansen (write-in) | 213 | 0.64% |
| Total votes | | 33,030 | 100.00% |
| Democratic hold | | | |

=== District 11 ===
Utah's 11th Senate District general election, 2022
| Party | Candidate | Votes | % |
|---|---|---|---|
| Republican | Daniel Thatcher (incumbent) | 24,680 | 100.00% |
| Total votes | | 24,680 | 100.00% |
| Republican hold | | | |

=== District 12 ===
Utah's 12th Senate District general election, 2022
| Party | Candidate | Votes | % |
|---|---|---|---|
| Democratic | Karen Mayne (incumbent) | 13,450 | 57.23% |
| Republican | Linda L. Paulson | 10,051 | 42.77% |
| Total votes | | 23,501 | 100.00% |
| Democratic hold | | | |

=== District 13 ===
Utah's 13th Senate District general election, 2022
| Party | Candidate | Votes | % |
|---|---|---|---|
| Democratic | Nate Blouin | 22,311 | 71.76% |
| Republican | Roger L. Stout | 8,781 | 28.24% |
| Total votes | | 31,092 | 100.00% |
| Democratic hold | | | |

=== District 14 ===
Utah's 14th Senate District general election, 2022
| Party | Candidate | Votes | % |
|---|---|---|---|
| Democratic | Stephanie Pitcher | 32,369 | 62.21% |
| Republican | Dan Sorensen | 18,737 | 36.01% |
| United Utah | Dennis Roach | 929 | 1.79% |
| Total votes | | 52,035 | 100.00% |
| Democratic hold | | | |

=== District 18 ===
Utah's 18th Senate District general election, 2022
| Party | Candidate | Votes | % |
|---|---|---|---|
| Republican | Daniel McCay (incumbent) | 23,873 | 66.39% |
| Democratic | Catherine Voutaz | 10,246 | 28.49% |
| United Utah | Jed C. Nordfelt | 1,842 | 5.12% |
| Total votes | | 35,961 | 100.00% |
| Republican hold | | | |

=== District 19 ===
Utah's 19th Senate District general election, 2022
| Party | Candidate | Votes | % |
|---|---|---|---|
| Republican | Kirk Cullimore Jr. (incumbent) | 28,020 | 58.44% |
| Democratic | Parker Bond | 16,626 | 34.68% |
| United Utah | Tyler L. Peterson | 3,301 | 6.88% |
| Total votes | | 47,947 | 100.00% |
| Republican hold | | | |

=== District 20 ===
Utah's 20th Senate District general election, 2022
| Party | Candidate | Votes | % |
|---|---|---|---|
| Republican | Ronald Winterton (incumbent) | 27,781 | 68.70% |
| Democratic | Jill M. Fellow | 12,655 | 31.30% |
| Total votes | | 40,436 | 100.00% |
| Republican hold | | | |

=== District 21 ===
Utah's 21st Senate District general election, 2022
| Party | Candidate | Votes | % |
|---|---|---|---|
| Republican | Mike Kennedy (incumbent) | 35,671 | 100.00% |
| Total votes | | 35,671 | 100.00% |
| Republican hold | | | |

=== District 23 ===
Utah's 23rd Senate District general election, 2022
| Party | Candidate | Votes | % |
|---|---|---|---|
| Republican | Keith Grover (incumbent) | 24,931 | 100.00% |
| Total votes | | 24,931 | 100.00% |
| Republican hold | | | |

=== District 28 ===
Utah's 28th Senate District general election, 2022
| Party | Candidate | Votes | % |
|---|---|---|---|
| Republican | Evan Vickers (incumbent) | 30,147 | 80.89% |
| Libertarian | Barry Evan Short | 3,766 | 10.11% |
| United Utah | Patricia A. Bradford | 3,354 | 9.00% |
| Total votes | | 37,267 | 100.00% |
| Republican hold | | | |
