= 2020 Utah Senate election =

- November 3, 2020

15 of the 29 seats in the Utah State Senate 15 seats needed for a majority
- Turnout: 41.67%
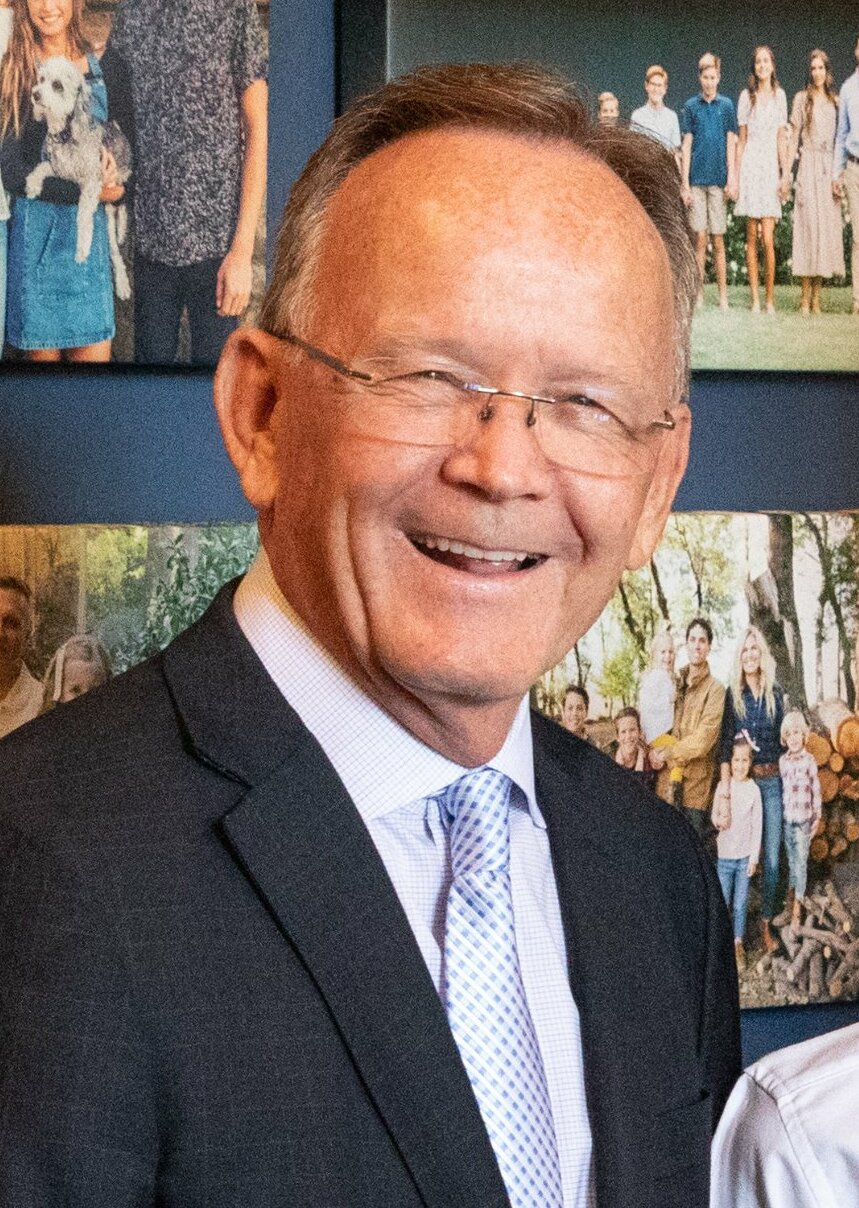

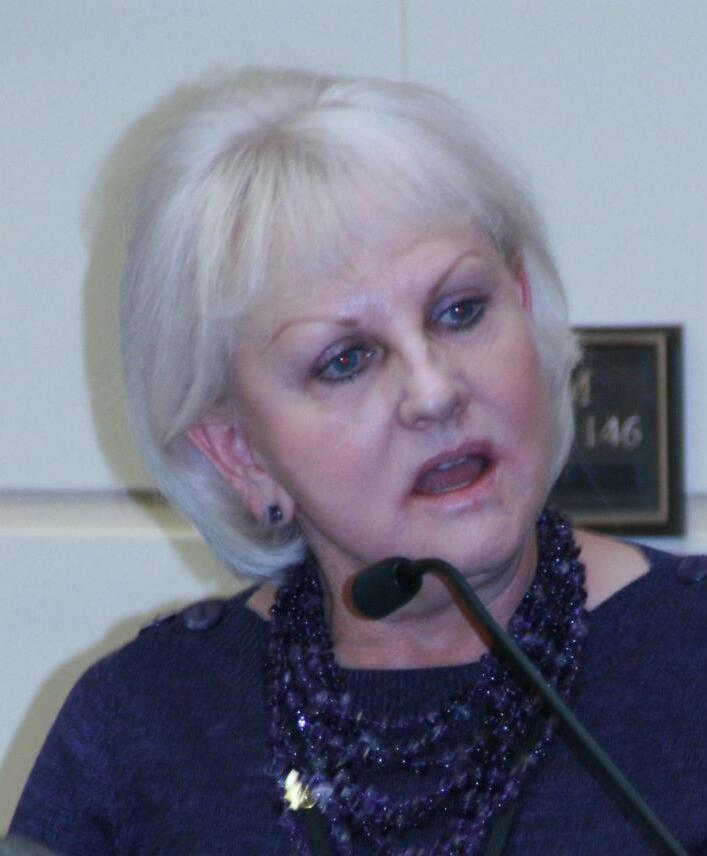
| | Majority party | Minority party |
|---|---|---|
| Leader | Stuart Adams | Karen Mayne |
| Party | Republican | Democratic |
| Leader's seat | 22nd District | 5th district |
| Seats before | 23 | 6 |
| Seats after | 23 | 6 |
| Seat change | Steady | Steady |
| Popular vote | 546,124 | 136,448 |
| Percentage | 77.90% | 19.46% |
- Results: Republican hold Democratic hold
President of the Senate before election
J. Stuart Adams
Republican
President
J. Stuart Adams
Republican

The 2020 Utah Senate election was held on November 3, 2020, to elect state senators in 15 of the 29 Utah State Senate districts. These coincided with other elections in Utah, including for governor and the House of Representatives. State senators serve four-year terms in the Utah State Senate.

== Results summary ==
Summary of the November 3, 2020 Utah State Senate election results
| Party | Candidates | Votes | | Seats | | | | |
| Party | Candidates | No. | % | Before | Up | Won | After | +/– |
|---|---|---|---|---|---|---|---|---|
| Republican | 15 | 546,124 | 77.90% | 23 | 13 | 13 | 23 | Steady |
| Democratic | 7 | 136,448 | 19.46% | 6 | 2 | 2 | 6 | Steady |
| United Utah | 1 | 11,351 | 1.62% | 0 | 0 | 0 | 0 | Steady |
| Independent | 2 | 7,097 | 1.01% | 0 | 0 | 0 | 0 | Steady |
| Total | | 701,020 | 100.0% | 29 | 15 | 15 | 29 | Steady |
Source: Utah Elections Results

Popular vote
| Republican | 77.9% |
| Democratic | 19.46% |
| United Utah | 1.62% |
| Independent | 1.01% |

Senate seats
| Republican | 86.67% |
| Democratic | 13.33% |

=== District results ===
| State senate district | Incumbent | Party | Elected senator | Party |
|---|---|---|---|---|
| Utah 1 | Luz Escamilla | Dem | Luz Escamilla | Dem |
| Utah 6 | Wayne Harper | Rep | Wayne Harper | Rep |
| Utah 7 | Deidre Henderson | Rep | Mike McKell | Rep |
| Utah 8 | Kathleen Riebe | Dem | Kathleen Riebe | Dem |
| Utah 10 | Lincoln Fillmore | Rep | Lincoln Fillmore | Rep |
| Utah 13 | Jake Anderegg | Rep | Jake Anderegg | Rep |
| Utah 14 | Dan Hemmert | Rep | Dan Hemmert | Rep |
| Utah 16 | Curt Bramble | Rep | Curt Bramble | Rep |
| Utah 19 | Allen M. Christensen | Rep | John D. Johnson | Rep |
| Utah 20 | D. Gregg Buxton | Rep | D. Gregg Buxton | Rep |
| Utah 23 | Todd Weiler | Rep | Todd Weiler | Rep |
| Utah 24 | Ralph Okerlund | Rep | Derrin Owens | Rep |
| Utah 25 | Lyle W. Hillyard* | Rep | Chris H. Wilson | Rep |
| Utah 27 | David Hinkins | Rep | David Hinkins | Rep |
| Utah 29 | Don Ipson | Rep | Don Ipson | Rep |

== Retirements ==
Three incumbents did not seek re-election in 2020.

=== Republicans ===
1. District 7: Deidre Henderson retired to run for lieutenant governor.
2. District 19: Allen M. Christensen retired.
3. District 24: Ralph Okerlund retired.

== Incumbents defeated ==
=== In primary elections ===
==== Republicans ====
One Republican lost renomination.

1. District 25: Lyle W. Hillyard lost renomination to Chris H. Wilson.

== Open seats that parties held ==
=== Republican seats held by Republicans ===
Republicans held three of their open seats.

1. District 7: Won by Mike McKell.
2. District 19: Won by John D. Johnson.
3. District 24: Won by Derrin Owens.

== Predictions ==
| Source | Ranking | As of |
|---|---|---|
| The Cook Political Report | Safe R | October 21, 2020 |

== Close races ==
| District | Winner | Margin |
|---|---|---|
| District 6 | Republican | 11.2% |
| District 8 | Democratic | 13.2% |
| District 19 | Republican | 14.2% |

== Results by district ==
=== District 1 ===
2020 Utah 1st State Senate district election
| Party | Candidate | Votes | % |
|---|---|---|---|
| Democratic | Luz Escamilla (incumbent) | 17,764 | 64.7% |
| Republican | Jim Whited | 9,681 | 35.3% |
| Total votes | | 27,445 | 100.0% |
| Democratic hold | | | |

=== District 6 ===
2020 Utah 6th State Senate district election
| Party | Candidate | Votes | % |
|---|---|---|---|
| Republican | Wayne Harper (incumbent) | 23,525 | 55.6% |
| Democratic | Erika Larsen | 18,774 | 44.4% |
| Total votes | | 42,299 | 100.0% |
| Republican hold | | | |

=== District 7 ===
2020 Utah 7th State Senate district election
| Party | Candidate | Votes | % |
|---|---|---|---|
| Republican | Mike McKell | 39,515 | 77.7% |
| United Utah | Emily Bergeson | 11,351 | 22.3% |
| Total votes | | 50,866 | 100.0% |
| Republican hold | | | |

=== District 8 ===
2020 Utah 8th State Senate district election
| Party | Candidate | Votes | % |
|---|---|---|---|
| Democratic | Kathleen Riebe (incumbent) | 28,811 | 56.6% |
| Republican | Brian Zehnder | 22,078 | 43.4% |
| Total votes | | 50,889 | 100.0% |
| Democratic hold | | | |

=== District 10 ===
2020 Utah 10th State Senate district election
| Party | Candidate | Votes | % |
|---|---|---|---|
| Republican | Lincoln Fillmore (incumbent) | 44,126 | 65.2% |
| Democratic | Dan McClellan | 23,586 | 34.8% |
| Total votes | | 67,712 | 100.0% |
| Republican hold | | | |

=== District 13 ===
2020 Utah 13th State Senate district election
| Party | Candidate | Votes | % |
|---|---|---|---|
| Republican | Jake Anderegg (incumbent) | 63,825 | 100.0% |
| Total votes | | 63,825 | 100.0% |
| Republican hold | | | |

=== District 14 ===
2020 Utah 14th State Senate district election
| Party | Candidate | Votes | % |
|---|---|---|---|
| Republican | Dan Hemmert (incumbent) | 47,716 | 100.0% |
| Total votes | | 47,716 | 100.0% |
| Republican hold | | | |

=== District 16 ===
2020 Utah 16th State Senate district election
| Party | Candidate | Votes | % |
|---|---|---|---|
| Republican | Curt Bramble (incumbent) | 27,227 | 100.0% |
| Total votes | | 27,227 | 100.0% |
| Republican hold | | | |

=== District 19 ===
2020 Utah 19th State Senate district election
| Party | Candidate | Votes | % |
|---|---|---|---|
| Republican | John Johnson | 27,728 | 57.1% |
| Democratic | Katy Owens | 20,857 | 42.9% |
| Total votes | | 48,585 | 100.0% |
| Republican hold | | | |

=== District 20 ===
2020 Utah 20th State Senate district election
| Party | Candidate | Votes | % |
|---|---|---|---|
| Republican | D. Gregg Buxton (incumbent) | 42,693 | 100.0% |
| Total votes | | 42,693 | 100.0% |
| Republican hold | | | |

=== District 23 ===
2020 Utah 23rd State Senate district election
| Party | Candidate | Votes | % |
|---|---|---|---|
| Republican | Todd Weiler (incumbent) | 40,575 | 93.9% |
| Independent | Marci Green Campbell (Write-in) | 2,656 | 6.1% |
| Total votes | | 43,231 | 100.0% |
| Republican hold | | | |

=== District 24 ===
2020 Utah 24th State Senate district election
| Party | Candidate | Votes | % |
|---|---|---|---|
| Republican | Derrin Owens | 41,010 | 90.2% |
| Independent | Warren Rogers | 4,441 | 9.8% |
| Total votes | | 45,451 | 100.0% |
| Republican hold | | | |

=== District 25 ===
2020 Utah 25th State Senate district election
| Party | Candidate | Votes | % |
|---|---|---|---|
| Republican | Chris H. Wilson | 32,677 | 71.4% |
| Democratic | Nancy Huntly | 13,075 | 28.6% |
| Total votes | | 45,752 | 100.0% |
| Republican hold | | | |

=== District 27 ===
2020 Utah 27th State Senate district election
| Party | Candidate | Votes | % |
|---|---|---|---|
| Republican | David Hinkins (incumbent) | 38,205 | 100.0% |
| Total votes | | 38,205 | 100.0% |
| Republican hold | | | |

=== District 29 ===
2020 Utah 29th State Senate district election
| Party | Candidate | Votes | % |
|---|---|---|---|
| Republican | Don Ipson (incumbent) | 45,543 | 77.0% |
| Democratic | Chuck Goode | 13,581 | 23.0% |
| Total votes | | 59,124 | 100.0% |
| Republican hold | | | |
