= Mark Madsen =

Mark Madsen may refer to:

- Mark Madsen (basketball) (born 1976), American basketball player and coach
- Mark Madsen (fighter) (born 1984), Danish mixed martial artist and wrestler
- Mark B. Madsen (born 1963), American politician and attorney from Utah
