= Greg Bell (politician) =

7th Lieutenant Governor of Utah

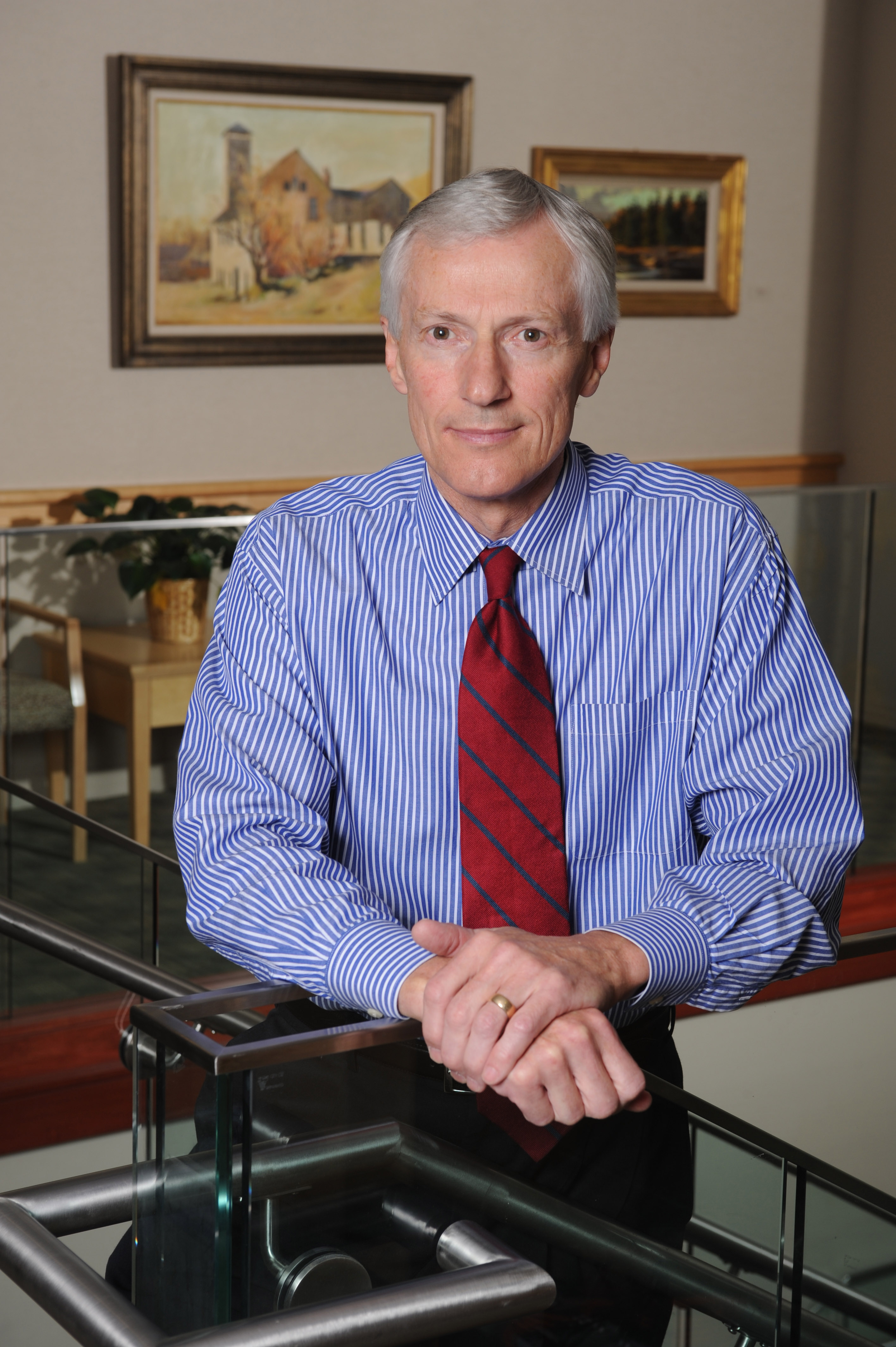

7th Lieutenant Governor of Utah
- In office September 1, 2009 – October 16, 2013
- Governor: Gary Herbert
- Preceded by: Gary Herbert
- Succeeded by: Spencer Cox

Member of the Utah State Senate from the 22nd district
- In office January 20, 2003 – September 1, 2009
- Preceded by: Terry R. Spencer
- Succeeded by: Stuart Adams

Personal details
- Born: October 16, 1948 (age 77) Ogden, Utah, U.S.
- Party: Republican
- Spouse: JoLynn Bell
- Children: 6
- Education: Weber State University (BA); University of Utah (JD)

Gregory S. Bell (born October 16, 1948) is an American politician, real estate developer, and attorney who served as the seventh lieutenant governor of Utah. A Republican, he was a member of the Utah State Senate, representing the state's 22nd senate district in Davis County. Bell was appointed Lieutenant Governor effective September 1, 2009. He was elected to half a term November 2, 2010, and then elected to a full term November 6, 2012.

== Early life and education ==
Bell was born October 16, 1948, in Ogden, Utah. He was raised in Ogden and Spring Glen, Utah. He graduated from Ogden High School in 1966, where he participated in debate and won the National Forensic Association's intermountain regional debate tournament in 1966. After serving a mission for the Church of Jesus Christ of Latter-day Saints in Germany from 1967 to 1969, Bell earned a Bachelor of Arts degree from Weber State University in 1972 and a Juris Doctor from the S.J. Quinney College of Law in 1975.

== Career ==
Bell was employed as vice president and general counsel of United Savings from 1977 to 1981. He left to found Gregory Bell and Associates law firm, which merged with Kirton & McConkie in 1984, where he was a shareholder, director, and officer until leaving in 1997. He became a partner in Raddon/Bell Properties, a real estate development company. Thereafter, Bell was self-employed in real estate development until 2008, when he joined the Salt Lake City law firm Fabian & Clendenin.

Bell was elected to the Farmington City Council in 1990 and in 1994 was elected mayor of Farmington, Utah, serving until 2002. He was elected to the Utah Senate in Utah's 22nd Senate district in 2002.

Bell succeeded Jon Huntsman Jr. as chair of Envision Utah, a position he held from 2001 to 2003. Envision Utah is a public/private partnership that "work[s] toward quality growth within the Greater Wasatch Area of Utah" and to develop a "vision to protect Utah's environment, economic strength, and quality of life for generations to come". Bell also served on the board of trustees of the Coalition for Utah's Future. He served as president of the Farmington Bay District of the Boy Scouts of America and as chair of the Real Property Section of the Utah State Bar.

Bell served as a member and chair of the governing authority of the Utah Science, Technology and Research initiative (USTAR) from 2014 until 2016. Governor Gary R. Herbert appointed Bell to the board of trustees of the Utah Transit Authority in 2016, and Bell was elected chair of the board effective January 2018.

He was elected to senate leadership as assistant majority whip by his colleagues for 2008–2009, serving on the Joint Leadership, Executive Appropriations, and Legislative Management Committees.

On September 16, 2013, Bell announced he would resign his position as Utah's lieutenant governor, citing his "family's long-term financial needs". Bell indicated that his resignation would take effect after Utah Governor Gary Herbert nominated, and the Utah State Senate confirmed, his replacement. Herbert nominated Spencer Cox to replace Bell on October 8, and Cox was subsequently confirmed and took office.

== Electoral results ==
Bell was first elected to the Utah State Senate in district 22 in the 2002 General Election held on Tuesday, November 5, 2002, with approximately 87% of the vote. His opponent was Green Party candidate David L. Rowland who obtained approximately 13% of the vote. Bell was up for re-election in the 2006 General Election held on Tuesday, November 7, 2006, and defeated Democratic Party candidate Dave Rowland by a margin of 71% to 23%. Also running in 2006 was Constitution Party candidate Sheryl Fluckiger who obtained approximately 6% of the vote.

Utah State Senate election, 2006
Party	Candidate	Votes	%	±%
Republican	Gregory S. Bell	14,718	71.4	
Democratic	David L. Rowland	4,699	22.8	
Constitution	Sheryl Fluckinger	1,200	5.8	

== Personal life ==
Bell is married to JoLynn (née Barker). They have six children: sons Braden, Ryan, Davis, and Christian, and daughters Andrea and Eliza, and 25 grandchildren. The Bells raised their children in Farmington and now live in Fruit Heights, Utah.

Political offices
Preceded by Gary Herbert	Lieutenant Governor of Utah; 2009–2013	Succeeded by Spencer Cox
