= Stephanie Hollist =

American politician

Member-elect of the Utah State Senate from the 7th district
- Assuming office January 2027
- Succeeding: Stuart Adams

Personal details
- Party: Republican

Stephanie Hollist is an American politician. A member of the Republican Party, she is the member-elect for the 7th district of the Utah State Senate.
