= Mark B. Madsen =

American politician

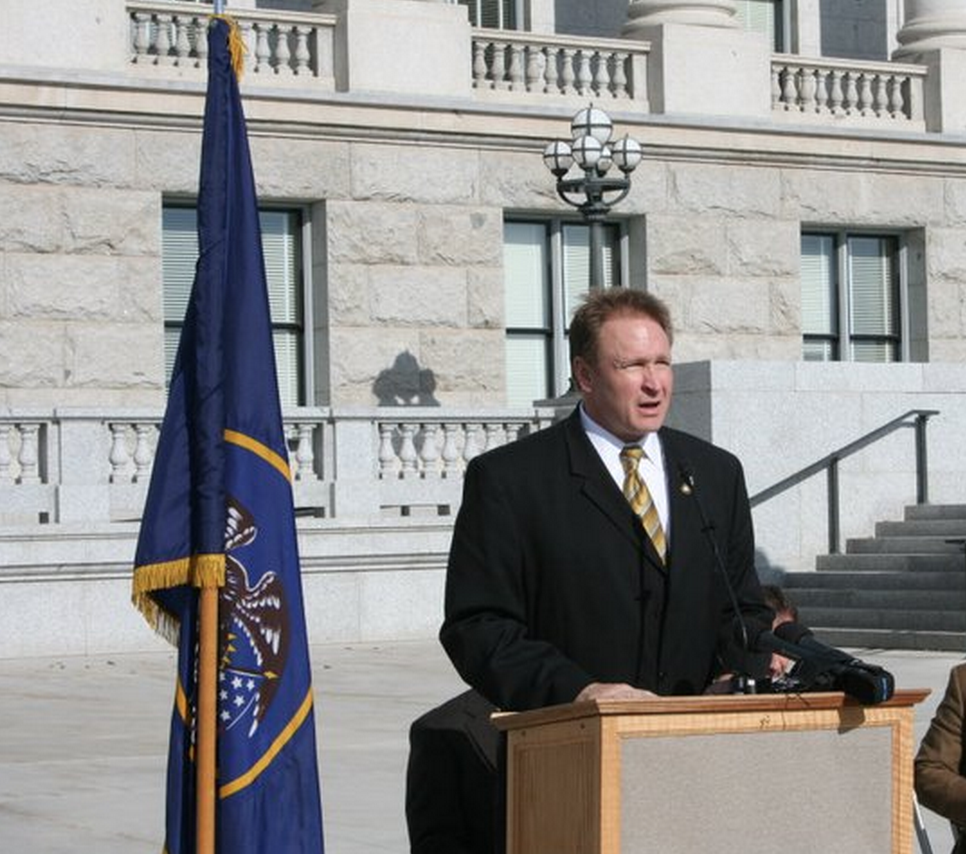

Member of the Utah Senate from the 13th district
- In office January 17, 2005 – January 2017
- Preceded by: Bill Wright
- Succeeded by: Jake Anderegg

Personal details
- Born: Mark Benson Madsen; May 8, 1963 (age 63) Washington, D.C., U.S.
- Party: Libertarian (2016–present)
- Other political affiliations: Republican (before 2016)
- Spouse: Erin
- Children: Five
- Education: George Mason University (BA); Brigham Young University (JD)
- Profession: Attorney

Mark Benson Madsen (born May 8, 1963) is an American politician and attorney from Utah. A Libertarian, he is a former member of the Utah State Senate, where he represented the state's 13th senate district in Utah, and Tooele Counties including the city of Lehi. Madsen is the grandson of Ezra Taft Benson, Secretary of Agriculture under President Eisenhower.

== Personal life, education, and career ==
Madsen received his bachelor's degree from George Mason University and his J.D. from the J. Reuben Clark Law School at Brigham Young University. In 1994, Mark met Erin Michele Allen, an Idaho native, working in Washington, D.C. They married in June 1995. Since relocating to Utah, Madsen has worked for Larry H. Miller Management in the Legal Department, as Project Manager in the commercial real estate division, and on other assorted projects as assigned by Mr. Miller. In March 2000, Madsen was elected as the first resident president of the North Ranch Homeowners Association. He and Erin have five children.

Madsen nearly died in 2007, when he accidentally overdosed on prescription pain medication. His doctor prescribed him a fentanyl patch for back pain. The patch burst, sending the medication right into his bloodstream. His kids found him on the couch. He was cold and not breathing. His family revived him with the help of 911. That's when he first became concerned about finding safer alternatives to opioids or prescription pain medications. He has since become an advocate for the legalization of medicinal marijuana.

=== Background ===
- Eagle Mountain City Council Member
- Americas 100 Emerging Political Leaders
- State Legislative Leaders Foundation
- Support of Excellence Award (UT Highway Patrol)
- Kentucky Colonel
- International Election Observer (Panama 1988 and Guatemala)
- Representative for National Convention 2008

== Political career ==
Madsen started his political career in 1984 when he lived and worked in the Washington, D.C. area. He began in January 1984, as an intern for Utah U.S. Senator, Orrin Hatch. He then went on to work for lobbying organizations promoting Ronald Reagan's Strategic Defense Initiative and a federal Balanced Budget Amendment. Madsen was elected to City Council in 2001. He was sworn in on January 7, 2002. He then ran for State Senate, and was first elected in 2004. Madsen is affiliated with the Federalist Society and the American Leadership Academy in Spanish Fork. Madsen last ran for office in 2012 when we won unopposed. He retired at the end of the 2016 session.

In 2016, Madsen served on the following committees:

- Social Services Appropriations Subcommittee
- Executive Offices and Criminal Justice Appropriations Subcommittee
- Public Education Appropriations Subcommittee
- Senate Education Committee
- Senate Judiciary, Law Enforcement, and Criminal Justice Committee (chair)
- Senate Rules Committee

At the end of the 2016 legislative session, Madsen announced that he no longer planned to run for office but would instead leave the United States to reside in South America for a time.

In July 2016, Madsen switched from the Republican to the Libertarian Party and endorsed Gary Johnson for president.

== Legislation ==
=== 2016 sponsored bills ===
Bill number and Title	Bill status
S.B. 73 Medical Cannabis Act	Senate/Filed for bills not passed 3/10/2016
S.B. 221 Capitol Protocol Amendments	Governor Signed 3/23/2016
S.B. 226 Civil Actions Involving Law Enforcement Officers or Emergency Vehicle Operators	Senate/Filed for bills not passed 3/10/2016
S.B. 254 Administrative Subpoena Amendments	Senate/Filed for bills not passed 3/10/2016

=== Notable legislation ===
In the 2008 session of the state legislature, Madsen was chief sponsor of SB 210, a bill that required proof of citizenship to be presented in order for Utahns to register to vote.

Local Salt Lake City media erroneously reported that S.B. 247, which Madsen sponsored, would honor Utah native gun creator John M. Browning on the current Martin Luther King Jr. holiday, as Madsen had originally proposed. He was criticized greatly for this. However, the language that Madsen ultimately put into the bill, S.B. 247S03, which passed both houses of the Utah Legislature and was signed into law, recognized John M. Browning on January 24, 2011.

In 2015, Senator Madsen introduced a medical marijuana bill, S.B.259, which failed because the legislature wanted to study the issue further during the interim before acting. In 2016, Madsen once again presented a medical marijuana bill. During this session, Madsen's bill had competition. Senator Evan Vickers introduced S.B. 89, this bill was a scaled back marijuana bill. During the session his difficulties increased when the Church of Jesus Christ of Latter-Day Saints said it opposed his bill. Still, Madsen, who is Mormon, continued to support his bill because polls show most Utah residents support the proposed law. "It would be immoral to back down," he said. After making 7 amendments to the bill, the LDS Church acknowledged that the changes were substantial. The bill, S.B. 73, passed out of the Senate, but died in the House Health and Human Services Committee. Neither of the marijuana bills passed during the 2016 Session.
