= Jennifer Plumb =

American politician in Utah

Member of the Utah State Senate from the 9th district
- Incumbent
- Assumed office January 1, 2023
- Preceded by: Derek Kitchen (Redistricting)

Personal details
- Party: Democratic
- Education: University of California, Los Angeles (B.S.), University of Utah (M.P.H, MD)
- Occupation: Physician

Jennifer Plumb is an American politician and pediatric trauma doctor from Salt Lake City, Utah. She represents Utah's 9th Senate district in the Utah State Senate.

== Education and career ==
Jennifer Plumb is a pediatric emergency department doctor and the director of Utah Naloxone, which she founded in 2015 after her brother died of a heroin overdose. As an opioid mitigation advocate, she lobbied for legislation on syringe exchanges and naloxone access. She is also a member of Utah's opioid abuse task force. In 2024, she passed SB061 which restricted the sale of flavored e-cigarettes (except for tobacco and menthol) and created a registry of products approved for sale so long as they met the flavoring requirement, were 4.0% nicotine or less, and were authorized to be sold by the FDA.

== Political career ==
Jennifer Plumb ran against incumbent Senator Derek Kitchen in 2018 and lost.

In a 2022 rematch of that contest, Plumb defeated Kitchen by 61 votes in the Democratic primary election for the redistricted 9th district. She faced a write-in candidate in the general election and won with 99.4% of the vote. In 2023, Plumb began serving as Assistant Minority Whip in the Utah Senate.

== Election History ==
2022 Utah Senate election, District 9
Party	Candidate	Votes	%
Democratic	Jennifer Plumb	32,817	99.4%
Write-in		213	0.6%

2022 Utah Senate Democratic Primary, District 9
Party	Candidate	Votes	%
Democratic	Jennifer Plumb	4,383	50.4%
Democratic	Derek Kitchen (Incumbent)	4,322	49.6%
