= Heidi Balderree =

American politician

Member of the Utah Senate from the 22nd District
- Incumbent
- Assumed office October 17, 2023
- Preceded by: Jake Anderegg

Personal details
- Party: Republican
- Education: Brigham Young University, Devry University

Heidi Balderree is an American politician and a member of the Utah Senate from the 22nd district. She assumed office on October 17, 2023, and replaced resigning state senator Jake Anderegg.

== Early life & education ==
Balderree graduated from Brigham Young University with a bachelor's degree in Anthropology and from the Keller Graduate School of Management with a Master's of Human Resource Management. She lives in Saratoga Springs, Utah.

== Political career ==
Following the announcement by Senator Jake Anderegg that he would resign on October 15, 2023, Balderree was elected to the Utah Senate in a special caucus meeting of the Utah Republican Party, which was held on October 11. She emerged from a field of thirteen candidates and six rounds of voting, having received 55.4% of the delegates' votes in the final round. According to her campaign website, her top legislative priorities include: transportation, education, economic stability, and anti-crony capitalism.

In 2024, Balderree ran for re-election to the Utah Senate, seeking her first full term. She won the primary election on June 25, defeating two opponents, and was unopposed in the general election.

Prior to serving in the Senate, Balderree was the Director of Community Engagement for the Utah chapter of Americans for Prosperity, a libertarian conservative political advocacy group in the United States. She started at Americans for Prosperity as a volunteer and worked there for ten years before resigning in order to focus on her role in the Utah Senate.

In 2022, Balderree ran for Utah County Clerk and was eliminated at convention.

=== Election history ===
Utah State Senate District 22 general election
Party	Candidate	Votes	%
Republican	Heidi Balderree	43,951	100%
Total votes		43,951	100%

Republican primary, Utah State Senate District 22
Party	Candidate	Votes	%
Republican	Heidi Balderree	6,164	47.7%
Republican	Emily Lockhart	4,432	34.3
Republican	Garrett Cammans	2,318	17.9%
Total votes		12,914	100%
