= Cory Maloy =

American politician (born 1962)

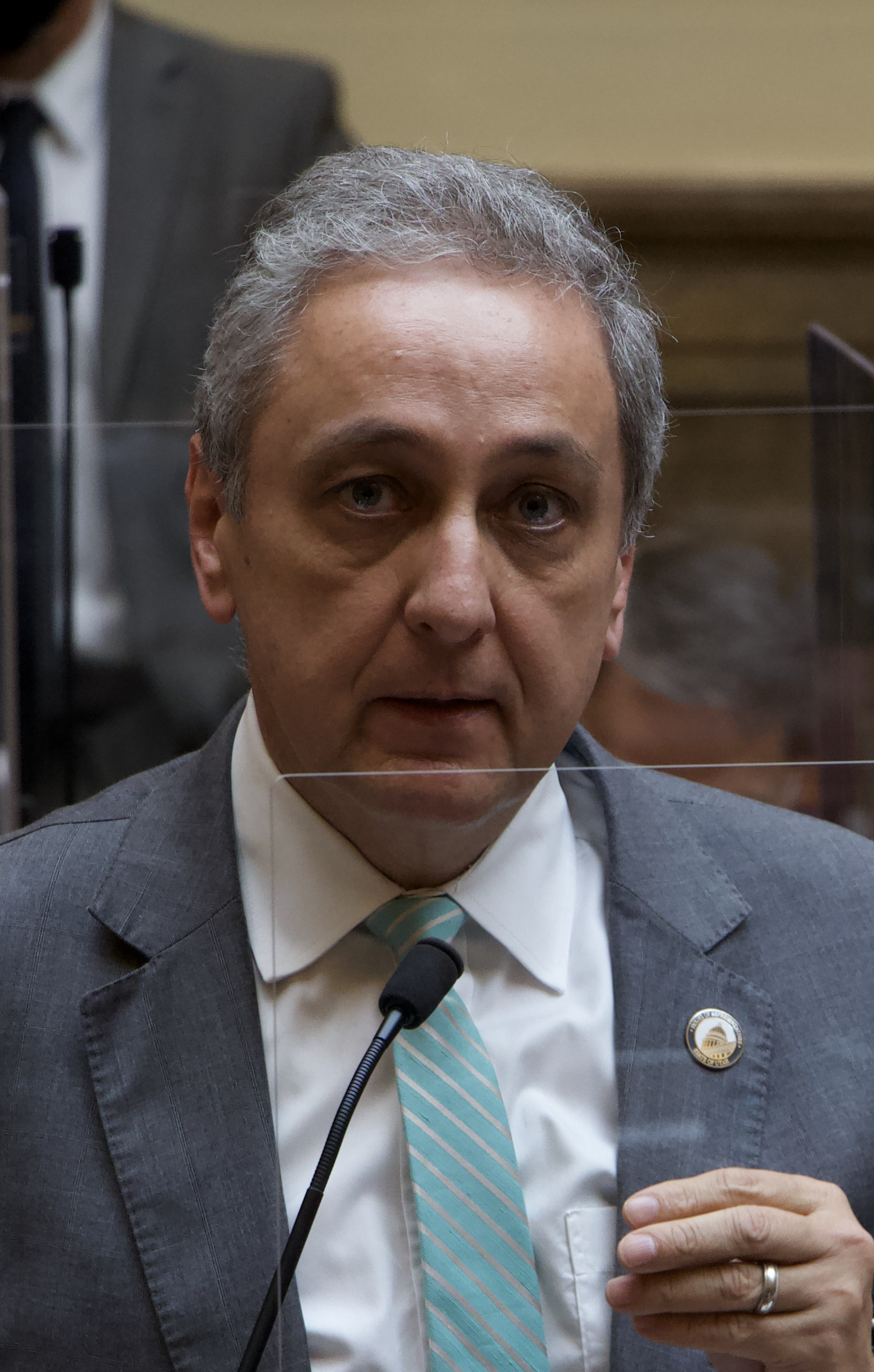
- Official Headshot

Member of the Utah House of Representatives
- Incumbent
- Assumed office January 1, 2017
- Preceded by: Jake Anderegg
- Constituency: 6th district (2017–2023); 52nd district (2023–present)

Personal details
- Born: July 31, 1962 (age 63) Phoenix, Arizona, U.S.
- Party: Republican

Cory Maloy (born July 31, 1962) is an American politician who has served in the Utah House of Representatives from the 52nd district. The 6th district was changed to the 52nd district due to redistricting where Maloy was re-elected in 2022.
