= Kelly Miles =

American politician in Utah

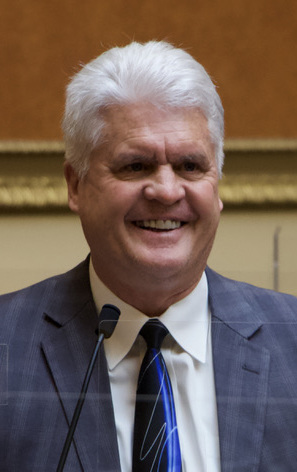

Member of the Utah House of Representatives from the 11th district
- In office January 1, 2017 – December 31, 2022
- Preceded by: Brad Dee
- Succeeded by: Katy Hall

Personal details
- Born: January 1, 1962 (age 64) Ogden, Utah
- Party: Republican

Kelly Miles (born January 1, 1962) is an American politician who served in the Utah House of Representatives from the 11th district.
