= Derek Kitchen =

American politician and entrepreneur

Member of the Utah State Senate from the 2nd district
- In office January 2019 – December 2022
- Preceded by: Jim Dabakis
- Succeeded by: Jen Plumb (redistricted)

Member of the Salt Lake City Council from the 4th district
- In office 2016 – January 1, 2019
- Preceded by: Luke Garrott
- Succeeded by: Ana Valdemoros

Personal details
- Born: August 30, 1988 (age 37) Salt Lake City, Utah, U.S.
- Party: Democratic
- Spouse: Moudi Sbeity (m. 2015; div. 2019)
- Education: University of Utah (BA)

Derek Kitchen (born August 30, 1988) is an American politician from Salt Lake City, Utah. He is a former member of the Utah State Senate who represented Utah's 2nd Senate District, and was formerly a Councilmember on the Salt Lake City Council representing Council District 4.

In 2023, Kitchen was appointed by President Joe Biden to serve as Senior Vice President of Congressional and Intergovernmental Affairs at the U.S. Export-Import Bank.

Kitchen and his restaurant Laziz Kitchen was featured on Food Network's Diners, Drive-Ins, & Dives.

== Education and career ==
Kitchen graduated in 2013 with a bachelor's degree in political science from the University of Utah.

Kitchen and his partner, Moudi Sbeity, opened Laziz Foods in 2012 to provide Lebanese food to local grocery stores and the Farmers Market in Salt Lake City. It was in 2016 they opened Laziz Kitchen, a Lebanese restaurant downtown. Laziz Kitchen has a partnership with the International Rescue Committee (IRC) to hire refugees and New Americans from Iraq and Syria. Laziz Kitchen appeared on Diners, Drive-Ins, & Dives.

In 2019, Kitchen completed Harvard University's John F. Kennedy School of Government program for Senior Executives in State and Local Government as a David Bohnett LGBTQ Victory Institute Leadership Fellow.

== Kitchen v. Herbert ==
In 2014, Kitchen and his partner sued the State of Utah for marriage equality with Kitchen v. Herbert. This case legalized same-sex marriage in Utah and five other states in the western U.S., establishing a groundbreaking case-law that led to nationwide marriage equality in 2015. Following the lawsuit, Kitchen was the subject of a documentary about the lawsuit that legalized gay marriage, called Church & State.

== Salt Lake City Council ==
In 2015, Kitchen was elected to represent Council District 4 in Salt Lake City where he led the effort to create a historic $21 million fund to create affordable housing in October 2016. He also worked to expand housing options in Salt Lake City with an update to the Accessory Dwelling Unit/Mother-in-law ordinance in 2018. He formerly served as a chair for the redevelopment agency.

== Utah State Senate ==
In 2018, Kitchen announced his bid for Utah State Senate District 2. He was endorsed by the outgoing senator Jim Dabakis, then the only openly gay member of the legislature, and won the close Democratic primary in July, winning 53 percent to his opponent Jennifer Plumb's 47 percent. On November 6, Kitchen won in the general election and was elected to serve in the 2019-20 Utah Senate Minority Leadership as Senate Caucus Manager. In 2020, Salt Lake police searched Kitchen's Venmo account after he gave $10 to a woman who was accused by the police of buying paint. This was after protests against killings by police in which the street in front of the district attorney's office was painted red. During his term, Kitchen proposed raising the minimum age for buying a gun from 18 to 21 and repealing the statute banning marriage for same-sex couples that is still on the books. In July 2022, he received 49.6 percent of the vote to Plumb's 50.4 percent in the Democratic primary for the Utah Senate's new 9th district.

== House of Representatives ==
Derek announced he is running for Congress in 2026.

== Personal life ==
Kitchen and Moudi Sbeity met in 2009 and married in 2015. They divorced in 2019.
