= Dan Hemmert =

American businessman and politician

Member of the Utah Senate from the 14th district
- In office August 26, 2016 – January 5, 2021
- Preceded by: Alvin B. Jackson
- Succeeded by: Mike Kennedy

Personal details
- Born: Orem, Utah, U.S.
- Party: Republican
- Spouse: Natalie
- Children: 6
- Education: Brigham Young University, Utah (BA, MBA, JD)

Daniel Hemmert is an American businessman and politician who served as a Republican member of the Utah Senate from 2016 to 2021. He was appointed in August 2016 in order to succeed Alvin B. Jackson, who had resigned the previous month.

Hemmert owns a dry cleaning business known as Red Hanger Cleaners and in the past has worked as a chief financial officer for OrangeSoda and JR Miller Enterprises. He ran for a full term to the Senate seat in the 2016 election and won. Hemmert also served as an alternate delegate for Mitt Romney to the 2012 Republican National Convention.

In August 2019, Hemmert joined the Republican primary to serve as Utah's 4th congressional district's representative, challenging Ben McAdams. However, he dropped out of the race in December 2019, citing problems transitioning out of his leadership position at Red Hanger.

== Personal life ==
Hemmert and his wife, Natalie, have 6 children and reside in Orem, Utah. He is a member of the Church of Jesus Christ of Latter-day Saints.
