= Nancy Huntly =

American ecologist

- Born: Traverse City, Michigan
- Education: Kalamazoo College (BA), 1977; University of Arizona (PhD), 1985
- Employer: Utah State University
- Political party: Democratic
- Board member of: Science Unwrapped; Northwest Power and Conservation Council Independent Scientific Review Panel (Past); Independent Scientific Advisory Board of the Columbia River Indian Tribes and NOAA Fisheries (Past)
- Honours: Skaggs Alaska Scientist in Residence at the Sitka Sound Science Center, 2014; Idaho State University Distinguished Researcher, 2007; Ecological Society of America Fellow, 2018

Nancy Huntly is an American ecologist based at Utah State University, where she is a Professor in the Department of Biology and director of the USU Ecology Center. Her research has been on biodiversity, herbivory, and long-term human ecology. She started her position at USU in 2011, after serving as a Program Officer in the Division of Environmental Biology at the National Science Foundation. Prior to that she was a faculty member in the Department of Biological Sciences at Idaho State University (Pocatello).

== Early life and education ==
Huntly grew up in rural Michigan. She spent time on her grandparents’ farm where she enjoyed being outside and exploring nature.

She received a BA in Biology from Kalamazoo College in 1977, and earned a PhD in Ecology and Evolutionary Biology from University of Arizona in 1985. Her PhD dissertation was entitled The influence of herbivores on plant communities: experimental studies of a subalpine meadow ecosystem. It examined the consistency of foraging habits of the Pika with the predictions of central place foraging theory.

== Career and research ==
Today Huntly serves as a Professor of Biology and director of the Ecology Center at Utah State University. Her research focuses on ecology and biodiversity, the food web, species interactions, and human ecology, especially in arid and alpine places.

An especially notable area of her study is her foundational research on food web structures and how they impact habitat restoration as part of river restoration initiatives, which is critical to an emerging understanding of environmental management in the Columbia River Basin. In 2012, Huntly and colleagues found that a lack of recognition of three factors act as obstacles to river restoration: contaminants, habitat carrying capacity, and hybrid food webs. These findings lay the foundation for active approaches to ecosystem management which prioritize protection rather than reclamation.

Before her work at Utah State University, Huntly worked on the Northwest Power and Conservation Council's Independent Scientific Review Panel of the Columbia River Basin Fish and Wildlife Program. In addition, she worked on the Independent Scientific Advisory Board of the Columbia River Indian Tribes and NOAA Fisheries.

== Awards ==
Huntly has received several awards and recognition for her work in the field of ecology.

- Skaggs Alaska Scientist in Residence at the Sitka Sound Science Center, 2014
- Idaho State University Distinguished Researcher, 2007
- 2018 Ecological Society of America Fellow, recognized for her “commitment to and innovation in both science communication and the application of ecological principles to the management of natural resources”

== Publications ==
In 1995, Huntly published a book entitled How Important Are Consumer Species To Ecosystem Functioning, and has also published five book chapters about ecological approaches to land use management, the food web on Alaska’s Sanak island, and an ecological coexistence mechanism called the storage effect. Additionally Huntly has contributed to 33 ecological journal articles in journals such as the Western North American Naturalist, Journal of Mammalogy, and the Great Basin Naturalist.

Top 5 most cited publications (as of Nov 2018):

- Herbivores and the dynamics of communities and ecosystems, Annual Review of Ecology and Systematics 22 (1), 477-503
- The roles of harsh and fluctuating conditions in the dynamics of ecological communities, The American Naturalist 150 (5), 519-553
- Ecological principles and guidelines for managing the use of land, Ecological applications 10 (3), 639-670
- Resource pulses, species interactions, and diversity maintenance in arid and semi-arid environments, Oecologia 141 (2), 236-253
- Old‐field succession on a Minnesota sand plain, Ecology 68 (1), 12-26

== Public engagement and outreach ==
Huntly is a chair of Science Unwrapped, a family-oriented community outreach program that combines a scientific presentation with hands-on learning. Science Unwrapped takes place monthly on the USU campus. She also aided students in founding the USU chapter of the Society for Advancement of Hispanics/Chicanos and Native Americans in Science (SACNAS).

Huntly is involved with the iUtah (Innovative Urban Transitions and Arid Region Hydro-sustainability) project, specifically on the project's efforts towards diversity and workforce development.
