= Chris H. Wilson =

American politician

Member of the Utah State Senate
- Incumbent
- Assumed office January 1, 2021
- Preceded by: Lyle W. Hillyard
- Constituency: 25th district (2021–2023); 2nd district (2023–present)

Personal details
- Party: Republican
- Spouse: Kiersten Wilson
- Education: Utah State University BA Business Administration, Finance
- Occupation: Auto dealer

Chris H. Wilson is a Republican member of the Utah Senate, representing the 2nd District since 2023. He previously represented the 25th District prior to redistricting.

== Personal life ==
Wilson was born in Logan, Utah and raised working for his family's car dealership, Wilson Motors Company. He attended Utah State University and in 2009 bought his family car dealership from his father. He then served as president of the New Car Dealers of Utah during the 2019 term.

== Political career ==
In 2020, Wilson announced he would run against the incumbent republican, Lyle W. Hillyard who had been unchallenged in a primary for 35 years. Wilson ran on a platform of pushing for term limits for state legislators, directly criticizing his predecessor for staying in office for as long as he did, even though Wilson had supported Hillyard in the past. Wilson claimed he was inspired to run after seeing his predecessor's tax reform votes, and described the incumbent, Hillyard, as "out of touch." He beat Democrat Nancy Huntly in the November 2020 election to the Utah State Senate. He represents the 25th district, which covers Cache and Rich counties.

== Electoral record ==
Utah State Senate election, 2024
Party	Candidate	Votes	%	±%
Republican	Chris H. Wilson	32,995	69.8	−1.62
Democratic	Nancy Huntly	14,262	30.2	+2.6

2020 Republican primary: Utah State Senate election District 25
Party	Candidate	Votes	%
Republican	Chris Wilson	11,283	62.7%
Republican	Lyle Hillyard	6,725	37.3%

Utah State Senate election, 2020
Party	Candidate	Votes	%	±%
Republican	Chris H. Wilson	32,667	71.42	
Democratic	Nancy Huntly	13,075	28.58	
