= Stuart Adams =

American politician

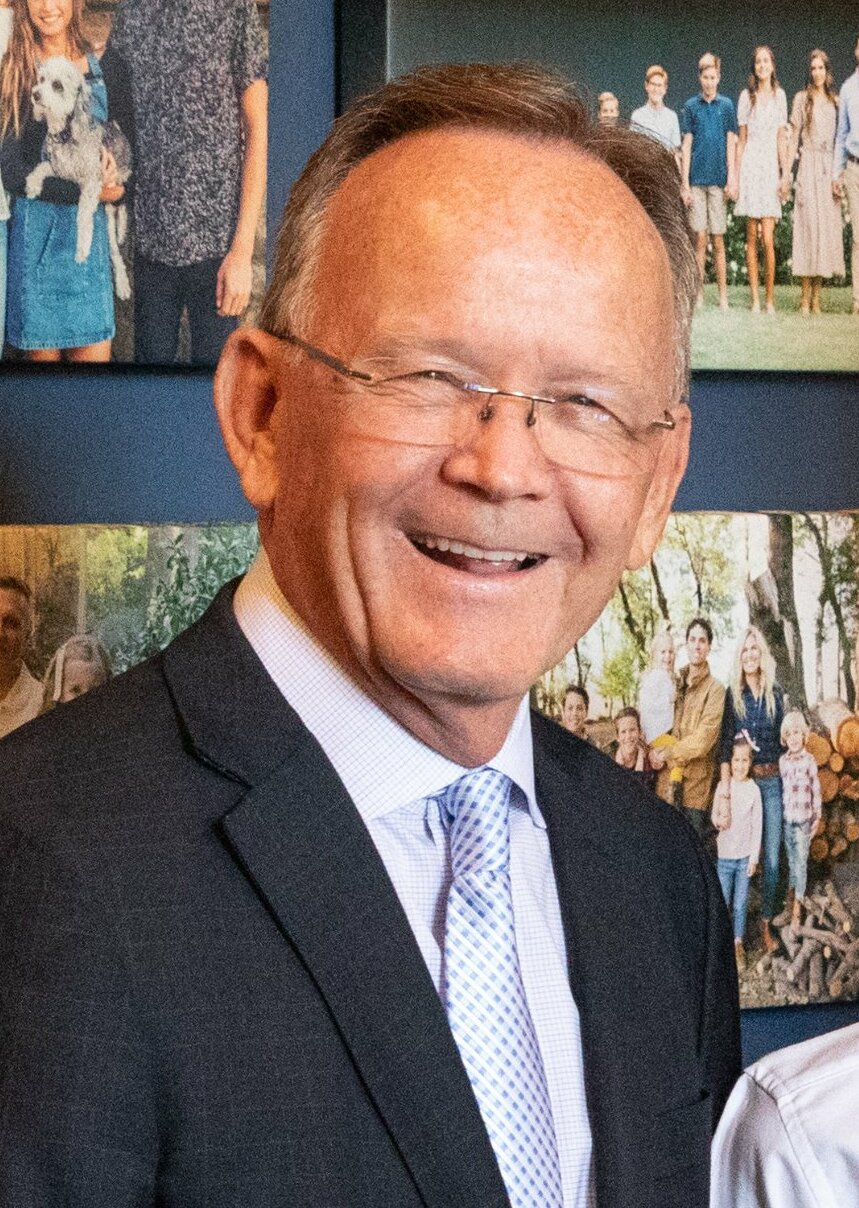
- Adams in 2022

President of the Utah Senate
- Incumbent
- Assumed office January 28, 2019
- Preceded by: Wayne L. Niederhauser

Member of the Utah Senate
- Incumbent
- Assumed office September 16, 2009
- Preceded by: Greg Bell
- Succeeded by: Stephanie Hollist (elect)
- Constituency: 22nd district (2009–2023); 7th district (2023–present)

Member of the Utah House of Representatives from the 16th district
- In office June 19, 2002 – December 31, 2006
- Preceded by: Kevin Garn
- Succeeded by: Kevin Garn

Personal details
- Born: Jabez Stuart Adams; 1954 or 1955 (age 71–72)
- Party: Republican
- Education: University of Utah (BS)

Jabez Stuart Adams (born 1954/1955) is the Republican senator for the Utah State Senate's 7th District. Prior to redistricting, he represented the 22nd District. Adams was appointed to the Utah House of Representatives in 2002 and then to the Senate in 2009. In 2012, he was chosen to be the Senate majority whip. In 2018, he was chosen to be Senate president.

In June 2026, Stephanie Hollist defeated Adams in his bid for re-election by 43% to 35%.

== Personal life, education, and career ==
Adams graduated from Layton High in 1972 and earned his BA from the University of Utah in business finance. He is a businessman by profession. Adams is married to Susan. They have four daughters together.

In 2002, he received the Business Person of the Year award from the Utah State Chamber of Commerce and the Builder of the Year award from the Northern Wasatch Home Builders Association. Adams previously served as the President of the Northern Wasatch Home Builders Association.

== Political career ==
Adams is a former chairman of the Utah State Transportation Commission. Prior to his legislative service, Adams served nine years on the Layton City Council.

Adams served for over four years in the Utah State House of Representatives from 2002 to 2006. He commenced his service in the Senate on September 16, 2009. He was appointed to both of these positions. In 2004, then-Representative Adams was named the 2004 Legislator of the Year by the Salt Lake Chamber of Commerce, the 2004 Legislator of the Year by the International Code Council, and the 2004 Representative of the Year by the Davis County Republican Women.

In 2016, Adams served as the majority whip. He has also served on the following committees:

- Executive Appropriations Committee
- Infrastructure and General Government Appropriations Subcommittee
- Public Education Appropriations Subcommittee
- Senate Business and Labor Committee
- Senate Transportation and Public Utilities and Technology Committee

In his 2026 re-election bid for an eighth senatorial term, Adams faced two Republican primary challengers, but signaled his intention to be re-elected as Senate president if he were to win the primary. In June 2026, Stephanie Hollist defeated Adams by 43% to 35%.

=== MIDA chairmanship and Project Stratos controversy ===
In 2008, then-governor Jon Huntsman Jr. appointed Adams to the Military Installation Development Authority (MIDA), which was established in 2007 to collect property taxes to fund infrastructural development projects, support military communities and missions, and prevent the closure of the Hill Air Force Base. As of July 2026, Adams is serving as MIDA's chairman in an on-and-off capacity, whereas the agency's executive director Paul Morris retired in June 2026 and was replaced by former state senator Dan Hemmert. In his current board term, Adams, in his capacity as Senate president, appointed himself to the board. During his chairmanship, MIDA oversaw the Deer Valley East Village ski resort expansion with Extell Development Company and a proposed uranium enrichment facility at Camp Williams.

On April 4, 2026, Adams "championed" and the agency approved Kevin O'Leary's Stratos project, which proposed the construction of a 40,000-acre data center in Box Elder County. The project garnered bipartisan criticism, with the "conservative criticism" stemming largely from the perceived lack of voter and official input on the "fast-tracked government approval" of the "accelerated economic development" and perceived circumvention of accountability. The project was also supplemented with 100% property tax relief. O'Leary claimed he was pressured to give in with "no choice" "for [Adams's] political reasons" via letter to remove 20,050 acres from the approved zoning area.

The New York Times cites the backlash to data centers as the focus behind his re-election primary loss to Stephanie Hollist.

=== 2024 criminal law controversy ===
In 2024, Adams was involved in discussions that led to a change in Utah law allowing enrolled 18-year-old high school students to be charged with unlawful sexual activity rather than child rape in certain cases involving 13-year-olds. The resulting legislation, adopted as part of SB 213, allowed prosecutors to charge enrolled 18-year-old high school students with unlawful sexual activity rather than child rape. The bill was not retroactive, but the law was later referenced in court hearings before Adams's 18-year-old granddaughter's case was resolved with a plea deal. Adams said he "did not request the legislation" and denied that the law change was intended to benefit the case involving his granddaughter.

=== 2021 congressional redistricting ===
In 2018, an independent redistricting commission was formed to better represent the public's voice when it came to redrawing Utah's congressional maps. A bipartisan group was formed to recommend congressional, state senate, state house, and state school board district boundaries based on public feedback and a strong focus on representation of "communities of interest." On November 1, 2021, the commission delivered its 12 recommendations that were vetted through 16 public hearings across the state to the legislature. The Princeton Gerrymandering Project gave favorable reviews to the maps the council drew. The state legislature, under the leadership of Senate President Adams, ignored the commission's recommendations and drew and approved their own maps. They divided Salt Lake County, the largest and most diverse county in the state, into the four congressional districts.

=== COVID response controversies ===
During the 2020 COVID-19 pandemic in Utah, Adams supported legislation to stockpile the experimental medication hydroxychloroquine. Soon it emerged that Utah had purchased $800,000 worth of the drug, at vastly inflated prices, from a local pharmacy with personal connections to Adams.

In 2022, Adams, as the Utah Senate president, opened the 2022 general session of the 64th legislature in person, without a mask. Having contracted COVID-19 the week before, Adams said he had recovered before speaking to the Senate at the start of the session. It was later revealed that he had tested positive for COVID-19 twice that morning. Adams continued his legislative duties unmasked, conversing in close contact with fellow senators, staff, and dignitaries, only masking when meeting with members of the media.

=== Elections ===
2026 Utah State Senate, primary election District 7
Party	Candidate	Votes	%
Republican	Stephanie Hollist	7,550	43
Republican	J. Stuart Adams	6,014	34.3
Republican	Braden Hess	3,981	22.7

2022 Utah State Senate, general election District 7
Party	Candidate	Votes	%
Republican	J. Stuart Adams	22,454	72.1
United Utah	Kimberly Wagner	8,703	27.9

2018 Utah State Senate, general election District 22
Party	Candidate	Votes	%
Republican	J. Stuart Adams	32,765	100
Total votes		—N/a	100.0

2014 Utah State Senate, general election District 22
Party	Candidate	Votes	%
Republican	J. Stuart Adams	16,605	73.3
Democratic	Kip Sayre	4,417	19.5
Libertarian	Brent Zimmerman	1,643	7.2

2010 Utah State Senate, general election District 22
Party	Candidate	Votes	%
Republican	J. Stuart Adams	16,638	70.09
Democratic	Charlie Parker	4,597	19.37
Constitution	David A. Hansen	2,028	8.54

== Legislation ==
=== 2016 sponsored bills ===
Bill number	Bill title	Bill status
S.B. 80	Infrastructure Funding Amendments	Governor Signed March 25, 2016
S.B. 115	Sustainable Transportation and Energy Plan Act	Governor Signed March 29, 2016
S.B. 130	Tattoo Removal	Governor Signed March 29, 2016
S.B. 154	Medicaid Accountable Care Organizations	Governor Signed March 29, 2016
S.B. 161	Highway Signage Amendments	Governor Signed March 25, 2016
S.B. 203	Immunity Amendments	Governor Signed March 22, 2016
S.B. 222	Professional Licensing Amendments	Senate/Filed for bills not passed October 3, 2016
S.B. 231	Waste Management Amendments	Senate/Filed for bills not passed October 3, 2016
S.B. 246	Funding for Infrastructure Revisions	Governor Signed March 22, 2016
S.B. 251	Water Infrastructure Funding Amendments	Governor Signed March 25, 2016
S.C.R. 12	Concurrent Resolution Recognizing the Importance of Utah Sport and Olympic Legacy Efforts	Senate/Filed for bills not passed October 3, 2016
S.C.R. 19	Concurrent Resolution on Education	Governor Signed March 22, 2016

=== 2017 sponsored bills ===
Bill number	Bill title	Bill status
S.B. 79	Waste Management Amendments	Governor Signed March 24, 2017
S.B. 167	Bail Amendments	Governor Signed March 15, 2017
S.B. 179	Animal Care and Control Appreciation Week	Governor Signed March 14, 2017
S.B. 196	Health Education Amendments	Governor Signed March 20, 2017
S.B. 197	Refinery Sales and Use Tax Exemption Amendments	Governor Signed March 25, 2017
S.B. 202	Parent-time Amendments	Governor Signed March 17, 2017
S.B. 228	Water Infrastructure Revisions	Senate/Filed for bills not passed September 3, 2017
S.B. 262	Upstart Amendments	Governor Signed March 28, 2017
S.B. 270	Sudden Cardiac Arrest Prevention Act	Senate/Filed for bills not passed September 3, 2017
S.B. 273	Energy Development Amendments	Governor Signed March 28, 2017
S.J.R. 13	Joint Resolution Supporting Creation of Citizens Equity Funds	Governor Signed March 16, 2017

Political offices
Preceded by Wayne L. Niederhauser	President of the Utah Senate; 2019–present	Incumbent
