= D. Gregg Buxton =

American politician

Gregg Buxton

Member of the Utah State Senate
- In office January 1, 2017 – December 31, 2024
- Preceded by: Scott K. Jenkins
- Succeeded by: Cal Musselman
- Constituency: 20th district (2017–2023); 4th district (2023–2024)

Member of the Utah House of Representatives from the 12th district
- In office 2003–2007

Personal details
- Party: Republican Party

David Gregg Buxton is an American politician. A Republican, he served in the Utah State Senate from 2017 to 2024. He was previously a member of the Utah House of Representatives beginning in 2003. He resigned his seat in 2007 to become the director of the Division of Facilities Construction and Management of Utah.
