= Todd Weiler =

American politician (born May 4, 1967)

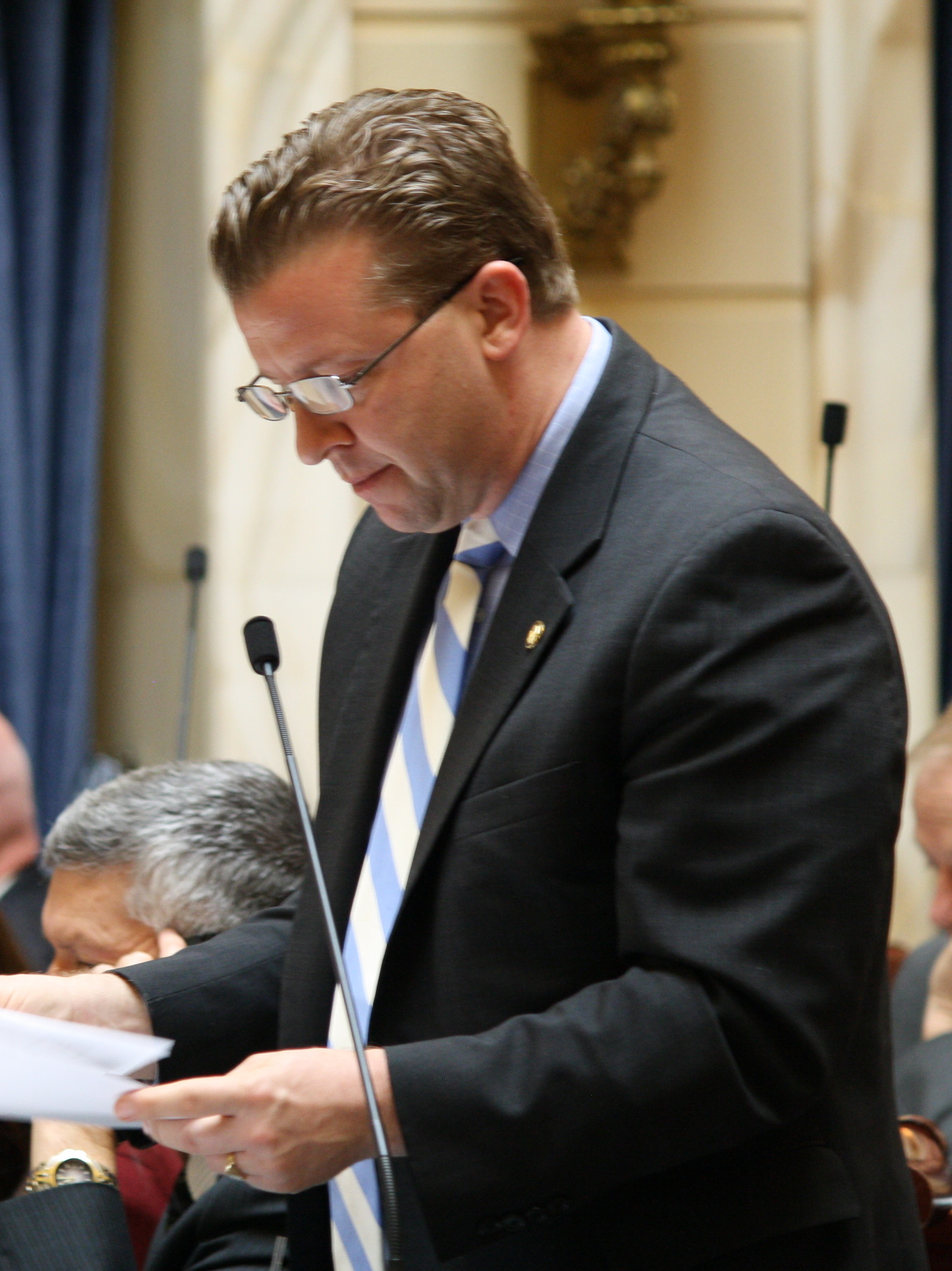
- Weiler in March 2013

Member of the Utah Senate
- Incumbent
- Assumed office January 13, 2012
- Preceded by: Dan Liljenquist
- Constituency: 23rd district (2012–2023); 8th district (2023–present)

Personal details
- Party: Republican Party
- Education: Brigham Young University
- Occupation: Attorney, Businessman

Todd Weiler (born May 4, 1967) is a Republican member of the Utah State Senate. He lives in Woods Cross, Utah. Weiler was first appointed to the state Senate in January 2012.

== Early life, education, and career ==
Weiler received his business degree from Brigham Young University and continued on there to get his J.D. degree from J. Reuben Clark Law School. Senator Weiler is affiliated with the Utah State Bar, and is associated with the Utah League of Cities and Towns. Weiler is an attorney by profession. Weiler has worked in-house for Logistics Specialties, Inc. He served as vice president of legal and general counsel, where he manages a small business unit and conducts all in-house legal needs.

Weiler has been married to his wife Elizabeth since 1991. They have four children.

== Political career ==
Weiler was appointed to his Senate seat on January 13, 2012, by the Governor. Before his job as Senator, Weiler was a member of Woods Cross City Council. From 1999 to 2011 he served as a delegate on the Rob Bishop for Congress Finance Committee and the Utah GOP State Central Committee. He was also the Davis County Republican Party Chair and the Utah GOP Vice Chair.

Weiler maintains a dismissive view of socialism and communism.

In 2015, Weiler voted in favor of the landmark LGBTQ rights bill "Antidiscrimination and Religious Freedom Amendments" which bans discrimination against lesbian, gay, bisexual and transgender people in employment and housing.

In 2016, Weiler was on the following committees:

- Retirement and Independent Entities Appropriations Subcommittee (Senate Chair)
- Social Services Appropriations Subcommittee
- Senate Business and Labor Committee
- Senate Judiciary, Law Enforcement, and Criminal Justice Committee
- Senate Retirement and Independent Entities Committee (Chair)
- Senate Rules Committee

=== Election ===
2024

2024 Utah State Senate election District 8
Party	Candidate	Votes	%
Republican	Todd Weiler	24,142	47.1%
Democratic	Aaron Wiley	16,555	32.3%
Independent	Alisa Cox Van Langeveld	8,807	17.2%
Constitution	Larry Livingston	1,736	3.4%
Total votes		51,240	100.0%

2024 Utah Senate Republican Primary
Party	Candidate	Votes	%
Republican	Todd Weiler	10,772	68.5%
Republican	Ronald Mortensen	4,965	31.5%

2020

2020 Utah State Senate election District 8
Party	Candidate	Votes	%
Republican	Todd Weiler	40,575	93.9%
Independent	Marci Green Campbell	2,656	6.1%

2016

2016 Utah State Senate election District 23
Party	Candidate	Votes	%
Republican	Todd Weiler	29,883	68.79%
Democratic	Steve Hartwick	13,953	31.83%

==== 2012 ====
2012 Utah State Senate election District 23
Party	Candidate	Votes	%
Republican	Todd Weiler	25,433	64.5%
Democratic	Breck England	14,027	35.5%

== Legislation ==
=== 2016 sponsored bills ===
Bill number	Bill title	Bill status
S.B. 5	Retirement and Independent Entities Base Budget	Governor Signed 2/16/2016
S.B 19	Phased Retirement	Governor Signed 3/25/2016
S.B. 20	Retirement Systems Audit Recommendations Amendments	Governor Signed 3/25/2016
S.B. 24	Utah Housing Corporation Sunset Extension	Governor Signed 3/18/2016
S.B. 29	Retirement Systems Amendments	Governor Signed 3/23/2016
S.B. 37	Human Resource Management Rate Committee	Governor Signed 3/23/2016
S.B.43	Firearm Safety and Violence Prevention in Public Schools	Governor Signed 3/22/2016
S.B. 54	Controlled Substance Database Modifications	Senate/Filed for bills not passed 3/10/2016
S.B. 59	Antidiscrimination and Workplace Accommodations Revisions	Governor Signed 3/28/2016
S.B. 60	Low-income Housing Tax Credit Allocation Amendments	Governor Signed 3/25/2016
S.B. 111	Guardianship - Right of Association	Governor Signed 3/25/2016
S.B. 113	Subjecting a Minor to Sexual Material	Senate/Filed for bills not passed 3/10/2016
S.B. 133	Small Employer Retirement Program	Senate/Filed for bills not passed 3/10/2016
S.B. 142	Improvement District Amendments	Governor Signed 3/28/2016
S.B. 148	Workforce Services Revisions	Governor Signed 3/25/2016
S.B. 155	Indigent Defense Commission	Governor Signed 3/22/2016
S.B. 169	Olene Walker Housing Loan Fund Amendments	Governor Signed 3/21/2016
S.B. 208	Retirement Amendments	Governor Signed 3/25/2016
S.B 213	Small Claims Court Amendments	Senate/Filed for bills not passed 3/10/2016
S.B. 219	Fair Housing Act Amendments	Governor Signed 3/23/2016
S.B. 223	Adoption Amendments	Senate/Filed for bills not passed 3/10/2016
S.B. 225	Notice of Pendency of Action Amendments	Governor Signed 3/25/2016
S.B. 229	Unlawful Detainer Amendments	Senate/Filed for bills not passed 3/10/2016
S.B. 230	Civil Stalking Offense Amendments	Senate/Filed for bills not passed 3/10/2016
S.B 233	Collection Process Amendments	Senate/Filed for bills not passed 3/10/2016
S.B. 243	Indigent Counsel in Private Parental Termination Cases	Senate/Filed for bills not passed 3/10/2016
S.C.R. 9	Concurrent Resolution on the Public Health Crisis	Governor Signed 3/29/2016
S.C.R. 18	Concurrent Resolution Designating Official Hashtag for the State of Utah	Senate/Filed for bills not passed 3/10/2016

=== Notable 2017 sponsored bills ===
Bill number	Bill title	Bill status
S.B. 185	Cause of Action for Minors Injured by Pornography	Governor Signed 3/28/2017
S.C.R. 1	Concurrent Resolution on Increasing Pay for Certain Public Safety Officers and Firefighters	Governor Signed 3/23/2017

=== Notable 2018 sponsored bills ===
Bill number	Bill title	Bill status
S.B. 87	School Security Locks	Governor Signed 3/16/2018
S.B. 27	Relationship Violence and Offenses Amendments	Governor Signed 3/19/2018
S.B. 118	Abortion Law Amendments	Governor Signed 3/19/2018
S.B. 184	Pharmacist Dispensing Authority Amendments	Governor Signed 3/19/2018

=== Notable legislation ===
- In 2014, Weiler also sponsored S.B. 229 Fourth Substitute Adoption Act Amendments, which helps give fathers more rights if a mother is putting the child up for adoption. This bill passed and was signed by the governor. He also ran S.B. 227 Exposure of Children to Pornography, which provides that a district court shall consider, when determining child custody in a separation or divorce, whether the parent has intentionally exposed the child to pornography or material harmful to a child; this bill also passed.
- During the 2016 legislative session Weiler sponsored and passed a joint resolution calling pornography a public health crisis in the state of Utah. He also sponsored a bill that would allow parents to opt their children into a gun safety education course through school. The course teaches students what to do if they come across a gun while at school.
- During the 2020 COVID-19 pandemic in Utah, Weiler supported legislation to stockpile the experimental medication hydroxychloroquine. On Twitter the Senator stated that "While the funds could be used for drugs like HCQ, they could be used for other potential treatments as well.” Soon it emerged that Utah had already purchased $800,000 worth of the drug, at vastly inflated prices, from a local pharmacy with connections to Senate President Stuart Adams.
