= Utah's 22nd State Senate district =

American legislative district

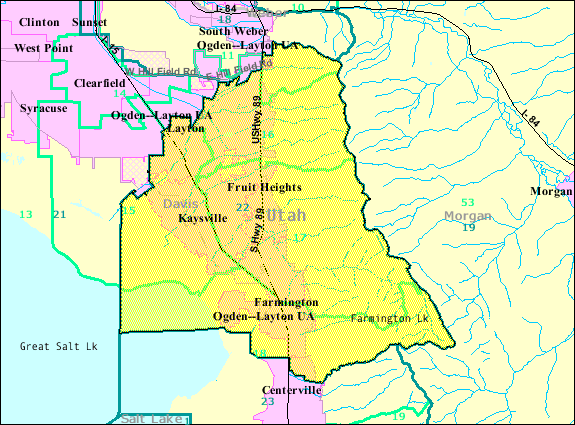
Map of the 22nd Utah Senate District.

The 22nd Utah Senate District includes parts of Salt Lake and Utah counties. The current State Senator representing the 22nd district is Heidi Balderee.

== Previous Utah State Senators (District 22) ==
Name	Party	Term
Terry R. Spencer	Republican	1999–2002
Craig L. Taylor	Republican	1995–1999
Haven J. Barlow	Republican	1973–1994
Robert F. Clyde	Republican	1967–1973
Jake Anderegg	Republican	2023
Heidi Balderree	Republican	2023-present

== Election results ==
=== 2006 General Election ===
Utah State Senate election, 2006
Party	Candidate	Votes	%	±%
Republican	Gregory S. Bell	14,718	71.4	
Democratic	David L. Rowland	4,699	22.8	
Constitution	Sheryl Fluckinger	1,200	5.8	

== See also ==
- Gregory S. Bell
- Utah Democratic Party
- Utah Republican Party
- Utah Senate
