= Jake Anderegg =

American politician

Member of the Utah Senate
- In office January 1, 2017 – October 15, 2023
- Preceded by: Mark B. Madsen
- Succeeded by: Heidi Balderree
- Constituency: 13th district (2017–2023); 22nd district (2023)

Member of the Utah House of Representatives from the 6th district
- In office January 1, 2013 – December 31, 2016
- Preceded by: Brad Galvez
- Succeeded by: Cory Maloy

Personal details
- Born: Sandy, Utah
- Party: Republican
- Education: Brigham Young University (BA); Westminster College (MBA)
- Website: jake4utah.com

Jacob 'Jake' L. Anderegg (born in Sandy, Utah) is an American politician. A Republican, he represented District 22 in the Utah State Senate. Prior to post-2020 redistricting he represented District 13 starting in January 2017. He previously represented District 6 in the Utah House of Representatives from 2013 to 2017.

== Early life and career ==
Anderegg was born on March 22 in Sandy, Utah and earned his Eagle Scout award as a teenager. He earned his BA in economics from Brigham Young University and his MBA from Westminster College. He lives in Lehi, Utah with his wife Julie and five children, two of whom were adopted from China. Anderegg is a member of the Church of Jesus Christ of Latter-day Saints.

He previously worked for Windchill Engineering as a sales manager. He is currently the Vice President of Community Development at Zions Bank. Anderegg also serves as a managing member of Skyline Investment Holdings, Political Insight Consulting, Zurich Capital LLC, and ThinkUtah, Inc.

== Political career ==
2014: Anderegg ran against Democrat Travis Harper in the 2014 General election. Anderegg won with 5,093 votes (81.66%) to Harper's 1,144 votes (18.34%).

2012: With District 6 incumbent Republican Representative Brad Galvez redistricted to District 29, Anderegg was one of two candidates chosen from among four for the June 26, 2012 Republican Primary, winning with 1,440 votes (56.7%), and won the November 6, 2012 General election with 10,513 votes (84.1%) against Democratic nominee Gabrielle Hodson.

During the 2016 legislative sessions, Anderegg served on the Infrastructure and General Government Appropriations Subcommittee, the House Business and Labor Committee, the House Rules Committee, and the House Transportation Committee.

Anderegg resigned from the Utah Senate in October 2023 due to a "significant change" in his personal employment.

== 2016 sponsored legislation ==
Bill number	Bill name	Bill status
HB0132S01	Local Government Licensing Amendments	House/ filed- 3/10/2016
HB0133	Municipal Government Amendments	House/ filed- 3/10/2016
HB0171	Apprenticeship Authorization Act	House/ filed- 3/10/2016
HB0194	Milk Sales Amendments	House/ to Governor - 3/15/2016
HB0303	International Relations and Trade Amendments	House/ filed- 3/10/2016
HB0357	Longitudinal Data Management Act	House/ filed- 3/10/2016
HB0358S03	Student Privacy Amendments	Governor Signed- 3/23/2016
HB0482	Imputed Income Amendments	House/ filed- 3/10/2016
HB0488	Notification Requirements for Ballot Proposals	House/ filed- 3/10/2016

Anderegg passed two of the nine bills he introduced during the 2016 General Session, giving him a 22.2% bill passage rate. He also floor sponsored SB0045 Compulsory Education Revisions and SB0100 Traffic Fines Amendments.

== Legislative activity ==
Anderegg sponsored HJR1 Joint Resolution on Religious Liberty and made the bill public on December 18, 2013. The resolution sought to amend the Utah Constitution to exempt religious institutions from performing or recognizing marriages that might violate their religious views. The bill garnered significant attention from the media and other members of the Utah State Legislature. The bill never left the Rules Committee and was filed on the last day of the 2014 General Session.
