= Utah State Senate =

Upper house of the Utah State Legislature

- Utah State Legislature

Type
- Type: Upper house
- Term limits: None

History
- New session started: January 21, 2025

Leadership
- President: J. Stuart Adams (R) since January 28, 2019
- Majority Leader: Kirk Cullimore Jr. (R) since January 21, 2025
- Minority Leader: Luz Escamilla (D) since January 17, 2023

Structure
- Seats: 29
- Political groups: Majority: Republican (22); Minority: Democratic (6); Other: Forward (1)
- Length of term: 4 years
- Authority: Article VI, Utah Constitution
- Salary: $130/day + per diem

Elections
- Last election: November 5, 2024 (15 seats)
- Next election: November 3, 2026 (15 seats)
- Redistricting: Legislative control

Meeting place
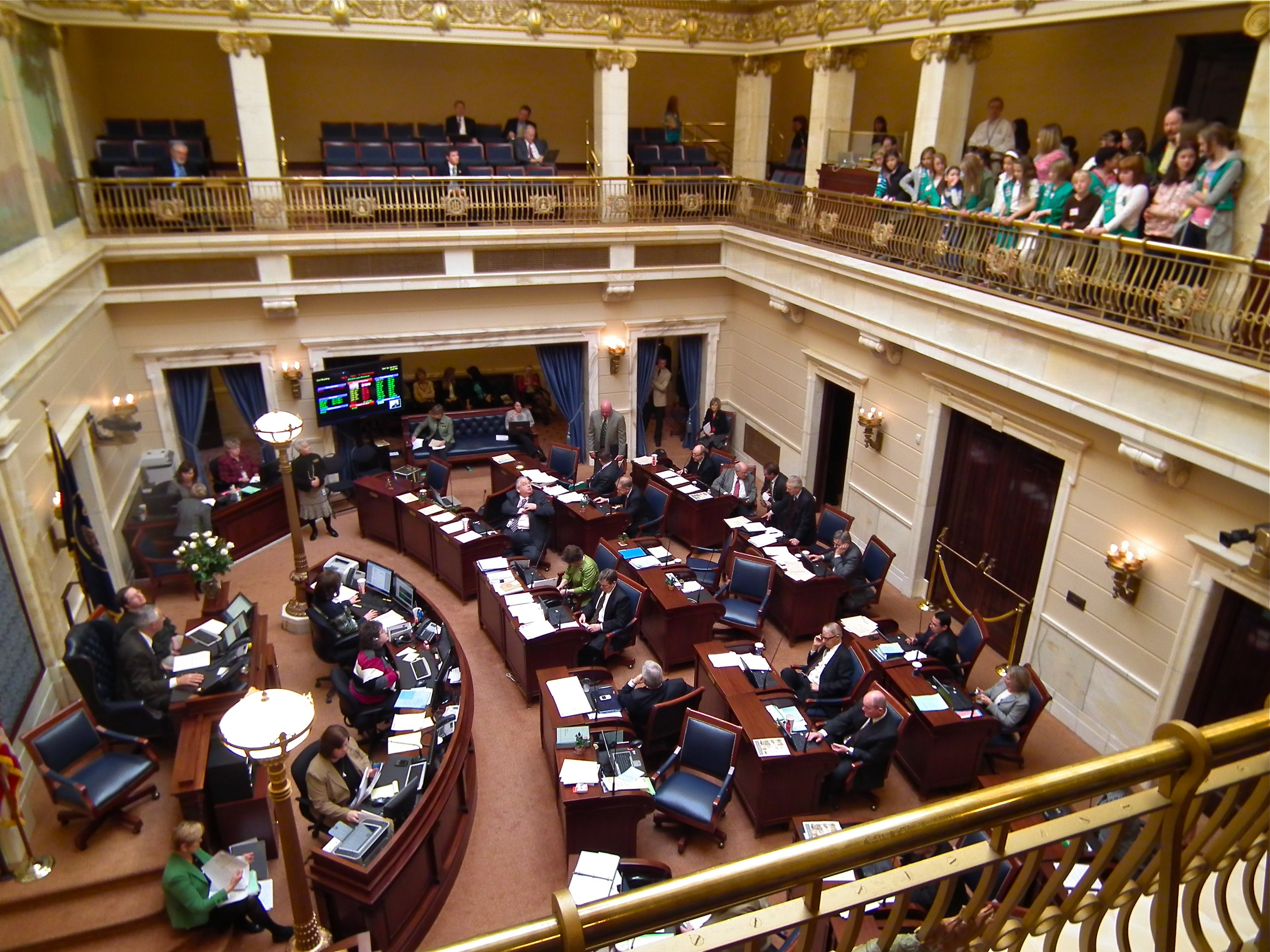
- State Senate Chamber; Utah State Capitol; Salt Lake City, Utah

Website
- Utah State Senate

The Utah State Senate is the upper house of the Utah State Legislature, the state legislature of the U.S. state of Utah. The Utah Senate is composed of 29 elected members, each representing one senate district. Each senate district is composed of approximately 95,000 people. Members of the Senate are elected to four-year terms without term limits. The Senate convenes at the Utah State Capitol in Salt Lake City.

The last elections were held in 2024.

== Composition of the Senate ==
Affiliation	Party (Shading indicates majority caucus)				Total	Vacant
Affiliation	Republican	Democratic	Forward	Libertarian	Total	Vacant
End of the 59th legislature	21	8	0	0	29	0
Beginning of the 60th Legislature	24	5	0	0	29	0
End 60th	23	5	0	1	29	0
61st Legislature	23	6	0	0	29	0
62nd Legislature	24	5	0	0	29	0
63rd Legislature	23	6	0	0	29	0
64th Legislature	23	6	0	0	29	0
65th Legislature	23	6	0	0	29	0
Begin 66th Legislature	23	6	0	0	29	0
March 7, 2025	22	6	1	0	29	0
December 12, 2025	22	6	0	0	28	1
December 17, 2025	22	6	1	0	29	0
Latest voting share	75.9%	20.7%	3.4%			

=== Leadership, 66th session ===
Position	Name	Party	District
President of the Senate	J. Stuart Adams	Republican	7
Majority Leader	Kirk Cullimore Jr.	Republican	19
Majority Whip	Chris H. Wilson	Republican	2
Assistant Majority Whip	Mike McKell	Republican	25
Minority Leader	Luz Escamilla	Democratic	10
Minority Whip	Karen Kwan	Democratic	12
Assistant Minority Whip	Jen Plumb	Democratic	9

=== Members of the 66th Senate ===
District	Name	Party	Start	Next Election	Counties	Residence
1	Scott Sandall	Rep	2018	2026	Box Elder, Cache, Tooele	Tremonton
2	Chris H. Wilson	Rep	2020	2028	Cache, Rich	Logan
3	John Johnson	Rep	2020	2028	Morgan, Summit, Weber	North Ogden
4	Cal Musselman	Rep	2024	2028	Davis, Weber	West Haven
5	Ann Millner	Rep	2014	2026	Davis, Morgan, Weber	Ogden
6	Jerry Stevenson	Rep	2010 (Note: Originally appointed.)	2026	Davis	Layton
7	J. Stuart Adams	Rep	2009	2026	Davis	Layton
8	Todd Weiler	Rep	2012	2028	Davis, Salt Lake	Woods Cross
9	Jen Plumb	Dem	2022	2026	Salt Lake	Salt Lake City
10	Luz Escamilla	Dem	2008	2028	Salt Lake	Salt Lake City
11	Emily Buss	FWD	2025	2026	Salt Lake, Utah, Tooele	Eagle Mountain
12	Karen Kwan	Dem	2023	2026	Salt Lake	Taylorsville
13	Nate Blouin	Dem	2022	2026	Salt Lake	Millcreek
14	Stephanie Pitcher	Dem	2022	2026	Salt Lake	Salt Lake City
15	Kathleen Riebe	Dem	2018	2028	Salt Lake	Cottonwood Heights
16	Wayne Harper	Rep	2012	2028	Salt Lake	Taylorsville
17	Lincoln Fillmore	Rep	2016	2028	Salt Lake	South Jordan
18	Daniel McCay	Rep	2018	2026	Salt Lake, Utah	Riverton
19	Kirk Cullimore Jr.	Rep	2018	2026	Salt Lake, Utah	Sandy
20	Ronald Winterton	Rep	2018	2026	Daggett, Duchesne, Summit, Uintah, Wasatch	Roosevelt
21	Brady Brammer	Rep	2025	2026	Utah	Pleasant Grove
22	Heidi Balderree	Rep	2023	2028	Salt Lake, Utah	Saratoga Springs
23	Keith Grover	Rep	2018	2026	Utah	Provo
24	Keven Stratton	Rep	2024	2028	Utah, Wasatch	Orem
25	Mike McKell	Rep	2020	2028	Utah	Spanish Fork
26	David Hinkins	Rep	2008	2028	Carbon, Emery, Garfield, Grand, Kane, San Juan, Utah, Wasatch, Wayne	Orangeville
27	Derrin Owens	Rep	2020	2028	Garfield, Juab, Kane, Millard, Piute, Sanpete, Sevier, Utah, Washington, Wayne	Fountain Green
28	Evan Vickers	Rep	2012	2026	Beaver, Iron, Juab, Millard, Washington	Cedar City
29	Don Ipson	Rep	2016	2028	Washington	St. George

== Legislative website ==
Utah Senate staff, under direction of Senate Presidents Waddoups and Niederhauser worked with the House of Representatives, the LFA, and other staff to develop what many have called the best legislative website in the nation. In 2014, le.utah.gov won the NCSL Online Democracy Award. The Utah Legislature previously won this award in 2005.

== See also ==
- Utah House of Representatives
- List of Utah State Legislatures
- Utah Democratic Party
- Utah Republican Party
