= 55th Utah State Legislature =

The 55th Utah State Legislature was elected Tuesday, November 5, 2002 and convened on Monday, January 20, 2003.

== Dates of sessions ==
- 2003 General Session: January 20, 2003 - March 5, 2003
- 2003 First Special Session: May 21, 2003 and June 18, 2003
- 2003 Second Special Session: November 19, 2003
- 2004 General Session: January 19, 2004 - March 3, 2004
- 2004 Third Special Session: June 28, 2004
- 2004 Fourth Special Session: September 15, 2004

== Officers ==
The Seal of Utah.

=== Utah State Senate ===
Office	Office-holder
President of the Senate	L. Alma Mansell (R-9)
Secretary of the Senate	Annette B.Moore
Minute Clerk	Mary Andrus
Docket Clerk	Lynette Erickson

=== Utah State House of Representatives ===
Office	Office-holder
Speaker of the House	Martin R. Stephens (R-6)
Chief Clerk	
Reading Clerk	
Journal Clerk	

== Leadership ==
=== Utah Senate ===
- President of the Senate: L. Alma Mansell (R-9)

Majority (Republican) Leadership

- Majority Leader: Michael G. Waddoups (R-6)
- Majority Whip: John L. Valentine (R-14)
- Assistant Majority Whip: Peter C. Knudson (R-17)
- Senate Rules Committee Chair: Lyle W. Hillyard (R-25)

Minority (Democratic) Leadership

- Minority Leader: Mike Dmitrich (D-27)
- Minority Whip: Ron Allen (D-12)
- Assistant Minority Whip: Gene Davis (D-3)
- Minority Caucus Manager:

=== Utah House of Representatives ===
- Speaker of the House: Martin R. Stephens (R-6)

Majority (Republican) Leadership

- Majority Leader: Greg Curtis (R-49)
- Majority Whip: Jeff Alexander (R-62)
- Assistant Majority Whip: Michael R. Styler (R-68)
- House Rules Committee Chair:

Minority (Democratic) Leadership

- Minority Leader: Brent H. Goodfellow (D-29)
- Minority Whip: Brad King (D-69)
- Assistant Minority Whip: Karen Morgan (D-46)
- Minority Caucus Manager: Patricia W. Jones (D-40)

== Utah State Senate ==
=== Make-up ===
Affiliation	Members
Republican Party	22
Democratic Party	7
Total	29
Government Majority	15

=== Members ===
Name	Party	District
Allen, Ron	Democrat	12
Arent, Patrice M.	Democrat	4
Bell, Gregory S.	Republican	22
Blackham, Leonard M.	Republican	24
Bramble, Curtis S.	Republican	16
Buttars, D. Chris	Republican	10
Davis, Gene	Democrat	3
Dmitrich, Mike	Democrat	27
Eastman, Dan R.	Republican	23
Evans, Beverly Ann	Republican	26
Evans, James M.	Republican	1
Gladwell, David L.	Republican	19
Hale, Karen	Democrat	7
Hatch, Thomas V.	Republican	28
Hellewell, Parley G.	Republican	15
Hickman, John W.	Republican	29
Hillyard, Lyle W.	Republican	25
Jenkins, Scott K.	Republican	20
Julander, Paula F.	Democrat	2
Killpack, Sheldon L.	Republican	21
Knudson, Peter C.	Republican	17
Mansell, L. Alma	Republican	9
Mayne, Ed P.	Democrat	5
Stephenson, Howard A.	Republican	11
Thomas, David L.	Republican	18
Valentine, John L.	Republican	14
Waddoups, Michael G.	Republican	6
Walker, Carlene M.	Republican	8
Wright, Bill	Republican	13

== Utah State House of Representatives ==
=== Make-up ===
Affiliation	Members
Republican Party	56
Democratic Party	19
Total	75
Government Majority	37

=== Members ===
Name	Party	District
Aagard, Douglas C.	Republican	15
Adams, J. Stuart	Republican	16
Alexander, Jeff	Republican	62
Allen, Sheryl L.	Republican	19
Anderson, Eli H.	Democrat	1
Barrus, Roger E.	Republican	18
Becker, Ralph	Democrat	24
Bennion, Chad E.	Republican	44
Bigelow, Ron	Republican	32
Bird, Calvin G.	Republican	65
Biskupski, Jackie	Democrat	30
Bourdeaux, Duane E.	Democrat	23
Bowman, DeMar Bud	Republican	72
Bryson, Katherine M.	Republican	60
Buffmire, Judy Ann	Democrat	35
Bush, Don E.	Republican	14
Buttars, Craig W.	Republican	3
Buxton, D. Gregg	Republican	12
Christensen, LaVar	Republican	48
Clark, David	Republican	74
Clark, Stephen D.	Republican	63
Cox, David N.	Republican	56
Curtis, Greg J.	Republican	49
Daniels, Scott	Democrat	25
Dayton, Margaret	Republican	61
Dee, Brad L.	Republican	11
Dillree, Marda	Republican	17
Donnelson, Glenn A.	Republican	7
Dougall, John	Republican	27
Duckworth, Carl W.	Democrat	22
Dunnigan, James A.	Republican	39
Ferrin, James A.	Republican	58
Ferry, Ben C.	Republican	2
Frank, Craig A.	Republican	57
Goodfellow, Brent H.	Democrat	29
Gowans, James R.	Democrat	21
Hansen, Neil A.	Democrat	9
Hardy, Ann W.	Republican	20
Harper, Wayne A.	Republican	43
Hendrickson, Neal B.	Democrat	33
Hogue, David L.	Republican	52
Holdaway, Kory M.	Republican	34
Hughes, Gregory H.	Republican	51
Hutchings, Eric K.	Republican	38
Johnson, Bradley T.	Republican	70
Jones, Patricia W.	Democrat	40
King, Brad	Democrat	69
Kiser, Todd E.	Republican	41
Last, Bradley G.	Republican	71
Lawrence, M. Susan	Republican	36
Litvack, David	Democrat	26
Lockhart, Rebecca D.	Republican	64
Love, Dana C.	Republican	13
Mascaro, Steven R.	Republican	47
McCartney, Ty	Democrat	31
McGee, Rosalind J.	Democrat	28
Morgan, Karen W.	Democrat	46
Morley, Michael T.	Republican	66
Moss, Carol Spackman	Democrat	37
Murray, Joseph G.	Republican	8
Newbold, Merlynn T.	Republican	50
Noel, Michael E.	Republican	73
Pace, Loraine T.	Republican	4
Peterson, Darin G.	Republican	67
Philpot, J. Morgan	Republican	45
Seitz, Jack A.	Republican	55
Shurtliff, LaWanna Lou	Democrat	10
Snow, Gordon E.	Republican	54
Stephens, Martin R.	Republican	6
Styler, Michael R.	Republican	68
Thompson, Mike	Republican	59
Ure, David	Republican	53
Urquhart, Stephen H.	Republican	75
Wallace, Peggy	Republican	42
Webb, R. Curt	Republican	5

Preceded by 54th Utah Legislature	55th Utah Legislature; 2003 - 2004	Succeeded by 56th Utah Legislature
