= 54th Utah State Legislature =

The 54th Utah State Legislature was elected Tuesday, November 7, 2000 and convened on Monday, January 15, 2001.

== Utah State Senate ==
=== Make-up ===
Affiliation	Members
Republican Party	20
Democratic Party	9
Total	
Government Majority	

=== Members ===
Name	Party	District	Counties
Allen, D. Edgar	Democrat	18	
Allen, Ron	Democrat	13	
Blackham, Leonard M.	Republican	28	
Bramble, Curt	Republican	16	
Buttars, D. Chris	Republican	5	
Davis, Gene	Democrat	3	
Dmitrich, Mike	Democrat	27	
Eastman, Dan R.	Republican	23	
Evans, Beverly Ann	Republican	26	
Evans, R. Mont	Republican	5	
Gladwell, David L.	Republican	19	
Hale, Karen	Democrat	7	
Hellewell, Parley G.	Republican	15	
Hickman, John W.	Republican	29	
Hillyard, Lyle W.	Republican	25	
Howell, Scott N.	Democrat	8	
Hull, Joseph L.	Democrat	20	
Jenkins, Scott K.	Republican	20	
Jones, Lorin V.	Republican	29	
Julander, Paula F.	Democrat	1	
Knudson, Peter C.	Republican	24	
Mansell, L. Alma	Republican	10	
Mayne, Ed P.	Democrat	11	
Montgomery, Robert F.	Republican	19	
Muhlestein, Robert M.	Republican	17	
Nielson, Howard C.	Republican	16	
Peterson, Millie M.	Democrat	12	
Poulton, L. Steven	Republican	9	
Spencer, Terry R.	Republican	22	
Steele, David H.	Republican	21	
Stephenson, Howard A.	Republican	4	
Suazo, Pete	Democrat	2	
Valentine, John L.	Republican	14	
Waddoups, Michael G.	Republican	6	
Walker, Carlene M.	Republican	8	
Wright, Bill	Republican	17	

== Utah House of Representatives ==
=== Make-up ===
Affiliation	Members
Republican Party	51
Democratic Party	24
Total	
Government Majority	

=== Members ===
Name	Party	District
Aagard, Douglas C.	Republican	15
Adair, Gerry A.	Republican	12
Alexander, Jeff	Republican	62
Allen, Sheryl L.	Republican	19
Anderson, Eli H.	Democrat	1
Arent, Patrice M.	Democrat	41
Baca, Loretta	Democrat	27
Barrus, Roger E.	Republican	18
Beck, Trisha S.	Democrat	48
Becker, Ralph	Democrat	24
Bennion, Chad E.	Republican	44
Beshear, Cindy	Democrat	39
Bigelow, Ron	Republican	32
Biskupski, Jackie	Democrat	30
Bourdeaux, Duane E.	Democrat	23
Bowman, DeMar Bud	Republican	72
Bradshaw, Afton B.	Republican	28
Bryson, Katherine M.	Republican	60
Buckner, Perry L.	Democrat	42
Buffmire, Judy Ann	Democrat	35
Bush, Don E.	Republican	14
Buttars, Craig W.	Republican	3
Carlson, Mary	Democrat	31
Clark, David	Republican	74
Clark, Stephen D.	Republican	63
Cox, David N.	Republican	56
Cox, Gary F.	Democrat	38
Curtis, Greg J.	Republican	49
Daniels, Scott	Democrat	25
Dayton, Margaret	Republican	61
Dillree, Marda	Republican	17
Donnelson, Glenn A.	Republican	7
Duckworth, Carl W.	Democrat	22
Ferrin, James A.	Republican	58
Ferry, Ben C.	Republican	2
Fife, Fred J.	Democrat	26
Frandsen, Lloyd W.	Republican	50
Garn, Kevin S.	Republican	16
Goodfellow, Brent H.	Democrat	29
Gowans, James R.	Democrat	21
Hansen, Neil A.	Democrat	9
Harper, Wayne A.	Republican	43
Hatch, Thomas V.	Republican	73
Hendrickson, Neal B.	Democrat	33
Hogue, David L.	Republican	52
Holdaway, Kory M.	Republican	34
Holladay, Bryan D.	Republican	47
Iverson, Dennis H.	Republican	74
Johnson, Bradley T.	Republican	70
Johnson, M. Keele	Republican	71
Jones, David M.	Democrat	25
Jones, Patricia W.	Democrat	40
King, Brad	Democrat	69
Litvack, David	Democrat	27
Lockhart, Rebecca D.	Republican	64
McCartney, Ty	Democrat	31
Morgan, Karen W.	Democrat	46
Moss, Carol Spackman	Democrat	37
Murray, Joseph G.	Republican	8
Nelson, Lowell A.	Republican	57
Newbold, Merlynn T.	Republican	50
Olsen, Evan L.	Republican	5
Pace, Loraine T.	Republican	4
Parker, Brent D.	Republican	5
Peterson, Darin G.	Republican	67
Philpot, J. Morgan	Republican	45
Ray, Paul	Republican	13
Rowan, Tammy J.	Republican	59
Saunders, Carl R.	Republican	11
Seitz, Jack A.	Republican	55
Short, Raymond W.	Republican	37
Shurtliff, LaWanna Lou	Democrat	10
Siddoway, Richard M.	Republican	20
Snow, Gordon E.	Republican	54
Snow, Marlon O.	Republican	58
Stephens, Martin R.	Republican	6
Stephens, Nora B.	Republican	13
Styler, Michael R.	Republican	68
Swallow, John E.	Republican	51
Thompson, Mike	Republican	59
Throckmorton, Matt	Republican	65
Tyler, A. Lamont	Republican	36
Ure, David	Republican	53
Urquhart, Stephen H.	Republican	75
Wallace, Peggy	Republican	42
Walsh, Richard L.	Republican	40
Way, Glenn L.	Republican	66
Winn, Bradley A.	Republican	57
Young, Max W.	Democrat	71
Zolman, David L.	Republican	39

Preceded by 53rd Utah Legislature	54th Utah Legislature; 2001 - 2003	Succeeded by 55th Utah Legislature
