= 35th Utah State Legislature =

The 35th Utah State Legislature was elected Tuesday, November 6, 1962, and convened on Monday, January 14, 1963.

== Election of 1962 ==
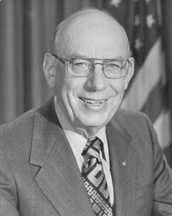
Republican U.S. Senator Wallace F. Bennett re-elected in 1962.

Prior to the 1962 election which brought Republicans to power, Utah Democrats controlled one U.S. Senate seat, both U.S. House districts, the Utah Senate (14-11), the Utah House (36-28) and controlled the majority of County Offices (146-117). After the election, the balance of power shifted to Utah Republicans who controlled the State Senate (13-12), State House (33-31), both Congressional Seats, and one Senate Seat along with the majority of County Offices (133-130). Republicans also elected a Republican as Utah's Attorney General. Democrat Frank Moss was elected to the U.S. Senate in 1958 and served until 1976, being defeated in the 1976 election by current U.S. Senate Orrin Hatch (as of 2006) thus dividing the Utah Senate delegation between the Democratic and Republican parties.

== Utah State Senate ==
=== Make-up ===
Affiliation	Members
Republican Party	13
Democratic Party	12
Total	25
Government Majority	1

=== Members ===
Name	Party	District
Barlow, Haven J.	Republican	15
Bernhard, John T.	Republican	7
Brockbank, W. Hughes	Republican	6
Browning, Frank M.	Democrat	4
Bullen, Reed	Republican	2
Gardner, Wallace H.	Republican	7
Grover, Wendell	Democrat	6
Hafen, Orval	Republican	18
Hammond, D. E.	Republican	6
Harmston, Gordon E.	Democrat	5
Holman, Vernon L.	Democrat	10
Hunter, Charles R.	Republican	11
Jenkins, Bruce S.	Democrat	6
Jenkins, Merrill	Democrat	4
Kerr, Kleon	Republican	1
Lambert, John A.	Democrat	3
Mantes, Ernest G.	Democrat	13
Memmott, Frank C.	Democrat	14
Miller, Clyde L.	Democrat	6
Rees, G. Stanford	Republican	9
Sowards, Leland	Democrat	16
Stacey, James N.	Republican	17
Taylor, G. Douglas	Republican	6
Taylor, Samuel J.	Republican	12
Waddingham, Thorpe A.	Democrat	8

== Utah State House of Representatives ==
=== Make-up ===
Affiliation	Members
Republican Party	33
Democratic Party	31
Total	64
Government Majority	2

=== Members ===
Name	Party	District
Adams, Irven Dick	Republican	6
Aiken, George R.	Democrat	26
Allen, Kay	Democrat	8
Anderson, Ralph C.	Democrat	8
Bott, Albert L.	Republican	4
Bullock, J. Robert	Republican	11
Cannon, Ralph S.	Republican	8
Clyde, Robert F.	Republican	10
Cochran, James Hubert	Democrat	8
Compton, Dean	Democrat	1
Conover, Eva W.	Democrat	16
Cooper, Glen H.	Republican	12
Darger, Stanford P.	Republican	8
Dean, Ernest H.	Democrat	11
Evans, Richard V.	Democrat	8
Green, D. B.	Democrat	1
Gunnell, Franklin W.	Republican	2
Halladay, F. Chileon	Democrat	7
Halpin, Jack	Democrat	15
Hamilton, Elmo W.	Democrat	8
Hansen, Russell H.	Republican	11
Harding, Ray M.	Republican	8
Harward, Royal T.	Republican	22
Hodgson, Allen L.	Democrat	11
Jones, Lawrence W.	Republican	18
Jorgensen, Cecil LaMar	Democrat	2
Kastler, B. Z.	Republican	8
Lambert, Roy G.	Democrat	9
Leavitt, Dixie L.	Republican	24
Lomax, Claude R.	Republican	13
Loveridge, Della L.	Democrat	8
Mayhew, E. J.	Republican	17
McKay, K. Gunn	Democrat	4
Memmott, Clifton N.	Democrat	28
Monroe, James Tim	Democrat	8
Monroe, LaMar Ralph	Republican	19
Peterson, Ferdinand E.	Republican	8
Peterson, Lionel L.	Republican	14
Pettersson, Carl E.	Democrat	8
Plant, Ross H.	Republican	2
Poulson, M. Phyl	Democrat	8
Redd, Leland W.	Republican	27
Rockwood, Clarence L.	Republican	8
Russell, George B.	Democrat	4
Seegmiller, Pratt	Republican	21
Sheffield, Ralph A.	Republican	8
Smith, J. McKinnon	Republican	8
Smith, S. Albert	Republican	20
Sonntag, Robert R.	Republican	8
Squire, Loren D.	Democrat	25
Stewart, Robert P.	Democrat	4
Stuart, J. Earl	Democrat	3
Tanner, Vasco M.	Democrat	11
Tebbs, Daniel A.	Republican	23
Thomas, David H.	Republican	8
Thurston, Glen	Republican	5
Tinker, John	Republican	29
Tracy, Aaron W.	Democrat	4
Vance, Elizabeth	Democrat	4
Warren, Marvin F.	Democrat	11
Watkins, Reed A.	Republican	8
Welch, Charles	Republican	8
Wilkinson, Finley F.	Republican	6
Williams, Russell S.	Democrat	15

== See also ==
- Utah State Legislature
- Office of the Governor
- List of Utah State Legislatures

Preceded by 34th Utah Legislature	35th Utah Legislature; 1963 - 1965	Succeeded by 36th Utah Legislature
