= 2nd Utah State Legislature =

The 2nd Utah State Legislature was elected Tuesday, November 3, 1896, and convened on Monday, January 11, 1897.

== Dates of sessions ==
- 1897 Biennial Session: January 11, 1897

== Leadership ==
=== Utah Senate ===
- President of the Senate: Aquila Nebeker

=== Utah House of Representatives ===
- Speaker of the House: John N. Perkins

== Utah Senate ==
=== Make-up ===
Affiliation	Members
Democratic Party	17
Populist Party	1
Republican Party	0
Total	18
Government Majority	16

=== Members ===
Name	Party	District	County
Allred, John F.		9	Sanpete
Caine, John T.	Democrat	6	Salt Lake
Cannon, Martha H.	Democrat	6	Salt Lake
Chambers, Robert C.	Democrat	5	Summit
Evans, Abel J.		7	Utah
Harbour, Benjamin A.		6	Salt Lake
Hamer, Daniel		4	Weber
Johnson, M. E.		12	Grand
Monson, Joseph	Democrat	2	Cache
Nebeker, Aquila	Democrat	3	Cache
Nebeker, William G.		1	Box Elder
Rideout, David O.		6	Salt Lake
Robison, Joseph V.		8	Millard
Shurtliff, Lewis W.		4	Weber
Smoot, Abraham O.		7	Utah
Snow, Edward H.	Democrat	11	Washington
Whitaker, George A.		6	Salt Lake
Wright, Isaac K.		10	Sevier

== Utah House of Representatives ==
=== Make-up ===
Affiliation	Members
Democratic Party	39
Populist Party	3
Republican Party	3
Total	45
Government Majority	33

=== Members ===
Name	Party	District	County
Anderson, Sarah E.	Democrat	4	Weber
Bennion, Heber	Democrat	8	Salt Lake
Callis, Charles A.		9	Summit
Cook, David S.		3	Rich
Cook, Samuel N.		1	Box Elder
Creer, Willard O.		11	Utah
Dotson, William L. H.		20	Beaver
Dresser, Norman B.		7	Tooele
Duffin, James G.		25	Washington
Forshee, James E.		21	Piute
Gibson, William		12	Uintah
Greenwood, Barnard H.		18	Sevier
Hansen, Andrew J.	Republican	23	Garfield
Hardy, Aaron		14	Sanpete
Hopkin, John		5	Morgan
Kenner, Scipio A.		8	Salt Lake
Kimball, Joseph		2	Cache
Kimball, Oliver G.		15	Carbon
LaBarthe, Eurithe K.	Democrat	8	Salt Lake
Lemmon, Hyrum		11	Utah
Lund, Louis P.		11	Utah
Mangan, Daniel		8	Salt Lake
Martin, V. P.		27	
Maxfield, Hiett E.		22	Wayne
McKay, Angus		4	Weber
Murdock, Joseph R.		10	Wasatch
O'Brien, William H.		4	Weber
Oveson, L. P.		16	Emery
Parry, John		24	
Perkins, John N.		4	Weber
Price, Moroni		2	Cache
Ray, William A.		19	Millard
Robinson, Joseph E.		26	Kane
Romney, George		8	Salt Lake
Roylance, William M.		11	Utah
Shephard, Richard B.		8	Salt Lake
Sloan, Robert W.		8	Salt Lake
Sorensen, Andrew P.		17	Grand
Sorenson, Neils C.		14	Sanpete
Stewart, Hyrum		6	
Taylor, Joseph E.		8	Salt Lake
Thompson, James		8	Salt Lake
Ingwald C. Thoresen		2	Cache
Wheeler, Claude V.		13	Juab
Wilson, Everett W.		8	Salt Lake

== See also ==
- List of Utah state legislatures
