= 6th Utah State Legislature =

Term of state legislature in Utah, US

The 6th Utah State Legislature was elected Tuesday, November 15, 1904, and convened on Monday, January 9, 1905.

== Leadership ==
=== Utah Senate ===
- President of the Senate: Stephen H. Love

=== Utah House of Representatives ===
- Speaker of the House: Thomas Hull

== Utah Senate ==
=== Members ===
Name	Party	District
Bamberger, Simon	Democrat	6
Barber, Alonzo G.		2
Bennion, Harden	Democrat	12
Callister, Thomas C.		8
Clegg, Peter		1
Hollingsworth, Charles R.		4
Gardner, Henry		7
Johnson, Willis		10
Larsen, C.P.		9
Lawrence, George N.		6
Lewis, A.B.		11
Loose, Charles Edwin		7
Love, Stephen H.		6
McKay, David		4
Park, Samuel C.		6
Rasband, Frederick		5
Walton, Wesley K.		3
Williams, William N.		6

== Utah House of Representatives ==
=== Members ===
Name	Party	District
Allen, O.D.		12
Anderson, A.V.		8
Anderson, James A.		5
Austin, George	Republican	11
Carroll, Charles W.		26
Christensen, N.C.		14
Cottam, Thomas P.		25
Cromar, Herbert B.	Republican	8
Curtin, James P.		15
Dailey, M.J.		9
Dean, George S.		4
Edward, William T.		8
Fisburn, Frank W.		1
Gundry, William N.		7
Hawley, Asa R.		18
Hone, George H.		11
Hopes, Herbert		13
Hull, Thomas		8
Johnson, Abram		14
Jones, Thomas J.		24
Joseph, Harry S.		8
Kinney, Clesson S.		8
Kuchler, Rudolph		4
Luther, Alfred		23
Lyman, Walter C.		27
Maughan, W.H.		2
Marks, Charles E.		8
McCrea, William		8
Merrill, Thomas		2
Miller, George M.		16
Pace, John E.		17
Pancake, Thomas C.		4
Panter, William J.		8
Petersen, James E.		21
Richards, Ezra F.		6
Roberts, David R.		2
Simons, Grant		11
Spencer, George		3
Stewart, William L.		4
Stookey, Stonewall J.		8
Stringam, George L.		22
Thompson, Orvil L.		19
Tolton, John F.		20
Whootton, John H.		11
Wilson, James B.		10

== See also ==
- List of Utah state legislatures
