= Senator Mayne =

Senator Mayne may refer to:

- Ed Mayne (1945–2007), Utah State Senate
- Karen Mayne (1946–2024), Utah State Senate
