= Terry Lee Williams =

American politician (born 1950)

Terry Williams
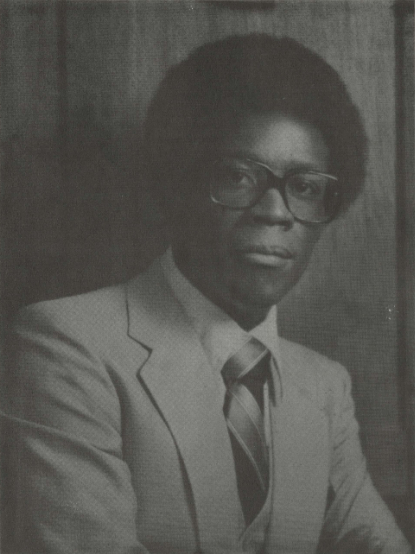
- Official portrait, 1982

Member of the Utah State Senate for the 1st district
- In office 1982–1986

Member of the Utah House of Representatives
- In office 1981–1982

Personal details
- Born: March 22, 1950 (age 76) Artesia, New Mexico, U.S.
- Party: Democratic
- Education: University of Utah (MA); Weber State College (BA)
- Occupation: Administrator - Bishop - Politician

Terry Lee Williams (born March 22, 1950) is an American retired university administrator, ecclesiastical bishop, and politician. A Democrat from Salt Lake City, he was the first African American to serve in the Utah State Senate, from November 1982 to December 1986. He had previously served in the Utah House of Representatives from 1981 through 1982. He was the second African American to serve in the Utah State Legislature, following the 1976 election of state representative Robert Harris.

== Early life and education ==
William was born in Artesia, New Mexico, on March 22, 1950. His stepfather was an agricultural migrant worker, and the family (including his mother and five other children) spent three years in Burley, Idaho, as the only Black people in Minadoka County. The family fled Idaho after white men in cars shot at their house and hurled incendiary devices while others stood across the street and hurled insults. "We were quite literally driven out of town," he recalled in a 1986 interview. After a brief return to New Mexico, the family settled in Salt Lake City in 1960 to continue medical treatment at the Shriners Children Hospital. He had been severely burned in a house fire. The family became active in the African Methodist Episcopal Church.

Williams graduated from South High School in Salt Lake City, Utah and Weber State University, where he served as president of the Young Democrats. He received a scholarship to earn a bachelor's degree in political science with a minor in Anthropology from Weber State University. He was awarded a full fellowship to earn his master's degree in economics from the University of Utah. He was appointed as a State House Fellow by Governor Scott Matheson at the Utah House of Representatives in 1977. After graduation, Williams became a community organizer and campaign worker in Salt Lake City. He was the director of the Central City Neighborhood Council, a non-profit agency that empowered citizens to be involved in the local government and helped low-income minority entrepreneurs launch start-up companies. He was named Director of the Salt Lake branch of the NAACP, which had a sister branch in Pocatello, Idaho.

== Political career ==
In 1980, Williams won a formerly Republican-held seat on the Utah House of Representatives. Fresh off his victory, he was the only representative to vote against a resolution pledging support for the socio-political agenda of President Ronald Reagan. Williams was the second African American to serve in the Utah House.

In 1983, Williams was elected to an open seat being vacated by Democrat Frances Farley to represent Utah's 1st State Senate district. He was the second African American to serve in the Utah House and the first to serve in the Utah Senate. As such, his colleagues were often dismissive of his abilities and ideas. "I got here in the House of Representatives when I was voted in," he recounted in a 1986 interview, "and I met with people who had never sat across a table with another black person. They didn't believe a black person could walk and talk intelligently at the same time." Williams served on the Senate State and Local Affairs and Judiciary committees. He campaigned for accessibility, wage scales for seniors, affordable housing, and civil rights. He played a key role in legislation that made Martin Luther King Jr. Day an official state holiday in 1986, though Utah was the last state to do so.

Instead of seeking reelection to the Utah Senate in 1986, Williams opted to run for the Democratic nomination for U.S. Senator. He lost the August primary election to realtor Craig Oliver by only 275 ballots out of nearly thirty thousand cast, receiving 49% of the vote to Oliver's 51%. Oliver went on to experience a resounding defeat at the hands of incumbent Republican Senator Jake Garn. Williams attributed his loss to racism, commenting that overwhelmingly white Utahns would not vote for a Black man for the U.S. Senate. In 1987, he filed a racial discrimination complaint against Salt Lake City for denying him a job in the capital planning department on account of his race; the department hired him after the mayor ordered a rerun of the search.

== Personal life ==
As of 1986, William was married and had four children. As of 1996, he was a minister living in Berkeley, California.
