= Bill Barton =

Bill Barton may refer to:

- Bill Barton (footballer) (born 1936), Australian rules footballer
- William T. Barton (born 1933), member of the Utah State Senate
