= Riessen =

Riessen is a German surname. Notable people with the surname include:

- Irmgard Riessen (born 1944), German actress
- Marty Riessen (born 1941), American tennis player

== See also ==
- Riesen (surname)
- Van Riessen
