= Senator McMullen =

Senator McMullen may refer to:

- Adam McMullen (1872–1959), Nebraska State Senate
- Fayette McMullen (1805–1880), Virginia State Senate
- John McMullen (politician) (1843–1922), Wisconsin State Senate

== See also ==
- Harry McMullan (1884–1955), North Carolina State Senate
- Dix H. McMullin (1933–2008), Utah State Senate
- Senator McMillan (disambiguation)
