= Van Riessen =

Van Riessen is a surname. Notable people with the surname include:

- Hendrik van Riessen (1911–2000), Dutch philosopher
- Laurine van Riessen (born 1987), Dutch speed skater and cyclist

== See also ==
- Riessen
