= Keith Grover =

American politician

Member of the Utah Senate
- Incumbent
- Assumed office June 7, 2018
- Preceded by: Margaret Dayton
- Constituency: 15th district (2018–2023); 23rd district (2023–present)

Member of the Utah House of Representatives from the 61st district
- In office January 1, 2007 – June 7, 2018
- Preceded by: Margaret Dayton
- Succeeded by: Marsha Judkins

Personal details
- Born: Provo, Utah
- Party: Republican
- Children: Jacob Grover, Landon Grover, Max Grover, Annie Grover, Ellie Grover
- Education: Brigham Young University; University of Utah
- Website: keithgrover.com

Keith Grover (born in Provo, Utah) is an American politician and a Republican member of the Utah Senate. Grover has represented Senate district 23 since 2023. Prior to redistricting he represented district 15 starting in June 2018.

== Early life and career ==
Grover was born in Provo, Utah. As a young man, Grover spent two years proselyting for the Church of Jesus Christ of Latter-day Saints (LDS Church) in Paraguay. He later earned his BS from Brigham Young University, and his MEd and EdD from the University of Utah.

Outside of his duties in the legislature, Grover has served as an administrator with the Alpine School District.

== Political career ==
- 2006 - Grover originally ran for office when District 61 incumbent Republican Representative Margaret Dayton ran for Utah State Senate and left the seat open. Grover won the 2006 Republican Primary with 1,678 votes (53.5%) and won the three-way November 7, 2006 General election with 4,222 votes (67.1%) against Democratic nominee Susan Chasson (who had run for the seat in 2004) and Constitution candidate Steve Saunders.
- 2008 - Grover was challenged during the primary election, but was chosen to be the Republican candidate for the November 4, 2008 general election. He won with 7,100 votes (64.5%) against Democratic nominee Deon Turley.
- 2010 - Grover ran against Democrat Deon Turley for the second time. Grover won the November 2, 2010 general election with 4,374 votes (65.1%) against Turley.
- 2012 - Grover was unopposed for the June 26, 2012 Republican Primary and won the November 6, 2012 general election with 8,786 votes (78.4%) against Democratic nominee Robert Patterson.
- 2014 - Grover was unopposed in the June 24, 2014 Republican convention and won the November 4, 2014 general election with 4,414 votes (80.4%) against Democratic nominee Robert Patterson.
- 2016 - Grover was unopposed in the June 28, 2016 Republican primary. He was unopposed in the November 8, 2016 general election, winning with 10,587 votes (100%).
- 2018 - Grover ran for Utah Senate District 15, leaving his previous seat in the House of Representatives open. He won the general election with 20,010 votes (76.5%) against United Utah Party nominee Lee Houghton and Independent American Party nominee Tommy Williams.
- 2022 - Grover ran for re-election and won the June 28, 2022 Republican primary with 8,833 votes (69.5%). He was unopposed in the November 8, 2022 general election, which he won with 24,931 votes (100%).

During the 2016 legislative session, Grover served on the Higher Education Appropriations Subcommittee, the House Public Utilities, Energy, and Technology Committee, and the House Government Operations Committee. During the interim, Grover served on the Economic Development and Workforce Services Interim Committee and the Public Utilities, Energy, and Technology Interim Committee. He also serves on the State Water Development Commission, and Utah International Relations and Trade Commission.

== 2016 sponsored legislation ==
Bill number	Bill title	Status
HB0196	Unlawful Detainer Revisions	Governor Signed - 3/25/2016

Grover floor sponsored SB0001 Higher Education Base Budget, SB0023 Water Law - Protected Purchaser Amendments, SB0044 Construction Code Amendments, SB0062 Jrotc Instructor Amendment, SB0221 Capitol Protocol Amendments, and SJR006 Joint Resolution Recognizing the 100th Anniversary of the JROTC Program.
