= Phil Riesen =

American politician

Member of the Utah House of Representatives from the 36th district
- In office 2006–2010
- Succeeded by: Patrice M. Arent

Personal details
- Born: May 8, 1943 (age 83) Ardmore, Oklahoma
- Party: Democratic Party
- Spouse: Glenda
- Occupation: Advertising

Phil E. Riesen was a Democratic member of the Utah State House of Representatives, representing the state's 36th house district from 2006 to 2010. At the end of his second term, he chose not to run for reelection.

Riesen studied at the University of Oklahoma.

Riesen was for many years a versatile broadcaster, at stations including KIFI in Idaho Falls, Idaho and KALL and KSL in Salt Lake City, Utah. His son Rob is a well-established northern Utah broadcaster.

Riesen returned to broadcasting as a newsman on Salt Lake City-Ogden station KLO in 2012.

== See also ==
- List of Utah State Legislatures
