= Margaret Dayton =

American politician from Utah

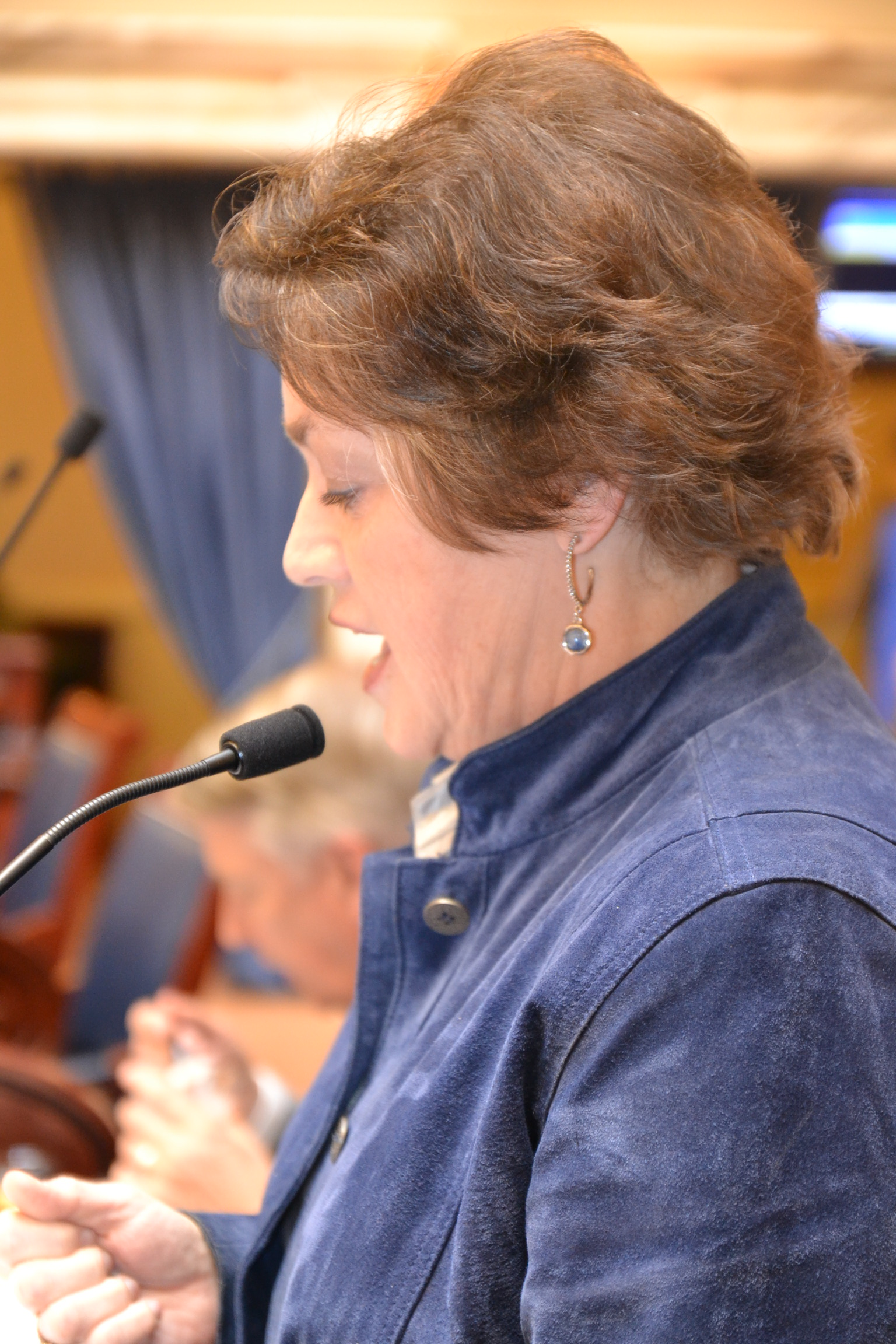

Member of the Utah Senate from the 15th district

Chair of the Natural Resources, Agriculture, and Environment Committee
- In office 15 January 2007 – June 2018
- Preceded by: Parley G. Hellewell
- Succeeded by: Keith Grover

Member of the Utah House of Representatives from the 61st district
- In office 3 August 1996 – 14 January 2007
- Preceded by: Lee Ellertson
- Succeeded by: Keith Grover

Personal details
- Born: May 17, 1949 (age 77) Spokane, Washington, U.S.
- Party: Republican
- Spouse: Lynn
- Children: 5
- Education: Brigham Young University (BS)
- Occupation: Homemaker
- Website: Legislative website

Margaret Dayton (born 1949) is an American politician from Utah. A member of the Republican Party, she served longer in the Utah Legislature than any other woman in Utah history. After serving a decade in the Utah House of Representatives, she unseated an incumbent senator in 2006 and served in that position until June 2018, when she resigned for medical reasons.

She represented the 15th Senate District which includes parts of Provo, Orem, Vineyard, Lindon and Pleasant Grove.

== Personal life, education, and career ==
Growing up in a military family, Dayton attended schools in five states. She graduated from Merced High School (California) and earned a Bachelor of Science in nursing from Brigham Young University. Dayton worked for several years as a registered nurse. In 1977, she married Lynn T. Dayton, a physician. Shortly after her marriage, Dayton chose to put aside her career as a nurse to become a full-time stay at home mother. The Daytons have five children.

She is a member of the Church of Jesus Christ of Latter-day Saints.

== Political career ==
In 1996, Dayton was appointed by Utah governor Mike Leavitt to fill out the remaining four months of the term of Rep. Lee Ellertson in Utah House District 61, a seat for which she was already running. She defeated Independent American Party candidate Gordon Norman with 90% of the vote in the election to retain the seat.

In 2006, Dayton ousted Republican incumbent Parley G. Hellewell to win the Republican nomination for the Utah Senate, and handily defeated Democrat Bethanie Newby in the November 2006 general election. Dayton won re-election in 2014 with over 80% of the vote against her Democratic challenger.

Dayton served in Senate leadership, and on the following committees:

- Natural Resources, Agriculture, and Environmental Quality Appropriations Subcommittee
- Retirement and Independent Entities Appropriations Subcommittee
- Senate Government Operations and Political Subdivisions Committee
- Senate Natural Resources, Agriculture, and Environment Committee – Chair
- Water Development Commission - Senate Chair

Dayton has been awarded an Honorary Doctorate from the Utah System of Higher Education, is a recipient of the Friend of Taxpayer Award and is included annually in Top Business Friendly Legislators.

In 2017, Dayton announced that she would run to fill the vacancy caused by Jason Chaffetz resigning from Congress.

=== Election ===
2014 Utah State Senate election District 15
Party	Candidate	Votes	%
Republican	Margaret Dayton	11,290	81.6%
Democratic	Emmanuel Kepas	2,548	18.4%

== Legislation ==
=== 2016 sponsored bills ===
Bill number and Title	Bill status
S.B. 23 Water Law Protected Purchaser Amendments	Governor Signed 3/17/2016
S.B. 25 Ballot Amendments	Governor Signed 3/18/2016
S.B. 26 Election Notice Amendments	Governor Signed 3/17/2016
S.B. 27 Absentee Ballot Amendments	Governor Signed 3/17/2016
S.B. 44 Construction Code Amendments	Governor Signed 3/25/2016
S.B. 62 JROTC Instructor Amendments	Governor Signed 3/17/2016
S.B. 72 School and International Trust Lands Management Act Amendments	Governor Signed 3/29/2016
S.B. 75 Water Rights Adjudication Amendments	Governor Signed 3/18/2016
S.B. 172 Utah State Developmental Center Amendments	Governor Signed 3/25/2016
S.B. 175 Fair Housing Act Option Amendments	Senate/Filed for bills not passed 3/10/2016
S.B. 227 Private Security Licensing Board Amendments	Senate filed 3/10/2016
S.J.R. 6 Joint Resolution Recognizing The 100th Anniversary of The JROTC Program	Senate/To Lieutenant Governor 3/15/2016

=== Notable legislation ===
In 2013, Dayton sponsored a bill that would require Utah to collect data on women who undergo abortions, including their race and their reason for doing so. Dayton, who is known for her opposition to legal abortion, wants to restrict the pathway to abortion in Utah. The Governor signed the bill on 22 March 2013. In 2016, Dayton questioned whether the state should be providing housing to the homeless through House Bill 346, asking if the "bill is based on the assumption that housing is a right the government is obligated to provide? Is that why we are providing tax payer money for that?" Dayton voted against the bill; however, it still passed both chambers and was signed by the Governor on March 25, 2016.

== Boards, affiliations, and awards ==
- Utah Valley University Executive Advisory Board
- College of Eastern Utah Board of Trustees
- Honorary Doctorate from USHE
- Utah Medical Association Alliance
- Utah Hospital Association Annual Recipient
- Guardian of Small Business Award
- Defender of Free Enterprise Awards
- Friend of Taxpayer Award, Utah Taxpayers Association
- Member of the National Rifle Association
- Cub Scout Leader
- President, PTA
- Member of the National Rifle Association
- Defender of Free Enterprise
- Teddy Roosevelt Award from Sportsman for Fish and Wildlife
