= Afton Bradshaw =

American politician

Member of the Utah House of Representatives from the 28th district
- In office January 1, 1986 – December 31, 2002
- Succeeded by: Rosalind McGee

Personal details
- Born: November 30, 1925
- Died: August 22, 2006 (aged 80) Salt Lake City, Utah
- Party: Republican

Afton Bradshaw (November 30, 1925 – August 22, 2006) was an American politician who served in the Utah House of Representatives from the 28th district from 1986 to 2002.

She died of pulmonary fibrosis on August 22, 2006, in Salt Lake City, Utah at age 80.
