= Emily Buss (politician) =

American politician

Member of the Utah Senate from the 11th district
- Incumbent
- Assumed office December 17, 2025
- Preceded by: Daniel Thatcher

Personal details
- Born: 1989 or 1990 (age 35–36)
- Party: Forward
- Children: 3
- Education: Brigham Young University–Idaho

Emily Buss (born 1990) is an American politician and nonprofit executive who is a member of the Utah State Senate, representing the 11th district as a member of the Forward Party. She won a poll held by the party to choose a successor for outgoing Forward senator Daniel Thatcher, who resigned on December 12, 2025.

Buss has been named one of Utah Business "2026 Forty Under 40" and one of Utah’s 2026 "Remarkable Women". Her nonprofit, Birthday Box Foundation was recognized by Utah’s Governor’s Office of Economic Development as one of "100 Utah Companies Championing Women by the Governor’s Office of Economic Opportunity".

== Career ==
Buss served as an AmeriCorps member, where she focused on community service and program development. That led her to the One Utah Service Fellowship, where she became a licensed SSW and case manager.

Buss is a nonprofit director, having co-founded Birthday Box Foundation with her husband Joel, a nonprofit that sends boxes of birthday party supplies to children in need. Buss has been named one of Utah Business "2026 Forty Under 40" and one of Utah’s 2026 "Remarkable Women". Birthday Box Foundation was recognized by Utah’s Governor’s Office of Economic Development as one of "100 Utah Companies Championing Women” in 2025.

Buss was sworn in as Utah’s only third-party state legislator and the youngest sitting Utah State Senator on December 17, 2025, at age 35.

=== Legislative service ===
Buss assumed office in 2025 and serves on the General Government Appropriations Subcommittee, the Senate Government Operations and Political Subdivisions Committee, the Senate Government Operations Confirmation Committee, the Senate Health and Human Services Committee, and the Social Services Appropriations Subcommittee.

== Personal life ==
Buss lives in western Utah County with her husband and their three children.

== Electoral history ==
=== Eagle Mountain City Council Election ===
Buss announced her candidacy for one of two city council seats up for election in Eagle Mountain, Utah, on June 16, 2025. Buss received 17% of the vote in the municipal open primary, tied for third-place among six candidates, and advanced to the general election with four other candidates. Buss received 24.3% of the vote in the general election, finishing in third-place and just shy of winning a city council seat.

=== 2025 Utah Senate Special Election ===
Buss was selected as the Forward Party of Utah's candidate to replace outgoing state senator Daniel Thatcher in Utah's 11th district on December 12, 2025. According to the Forward Party, this was the first time in United States history that approval voting was used to elect a state legislator, and the first time that a political party in the nation opened a replacement vote to all registered voters in a district, regardless of party. Typically, political parties in Utah let only local party delegates in the district vote on replacement legislators. In-person, online, and mail-in voting took place over multiple days, and prospective candidates pledged not to exceed a $300 campaign spending limit. Buss spent $0 on her special election campaign. Following the poll, the Forward Party formally submitted her name to the Governor who, under Utah law, was required to appoint a replacement chosen by the outgoing legislator's political party.

2025 Utah Senate District 11 special Forward primary
Party	Candidate	Votes	%
Forward	Emily Buss	625	47.21%
Forward	Maleah Bliss	436	32.93%
Forward	Tyley Bean	426	32.18%
Forward	Jeff Marshall	418	31.57%
Forward	Jeff Saunders	403	30.44%
Total votes		2,308	
Turnout		1,324	
