= Richard M. Siddoway =

American politician and author

Richard M. Siddoway (born 1940) is an American author and politician. He was a member of the Utah House of Representatives from 1997 to 2002, serving as a Republican. Siddoway is also the author of several books including the New York Times bestseller The Christmas Wish.

== Biography ==
Siddoway was born in Salt Lake City and raised in Bountiful, Utah. He and his wife Janice have eight children. He has been an educator for over forty years and for a time was the principal of the Electronic High School for the Utah State Department of Education.

In 1998 The Christmas Wish was adapted into a CBS movie. Siddoway has also written several other books with Christmas themes such as Twelve Tales of Christmas, Christmas of the Cherry Snow, and The Christmas Quest. He has also written other books such as Degrees of Glory, Mom and Other Great Women I Have Known, Habits of the Heart and The Hut in The Tree in The Woods.

From 1996 to 2005 Siddoway served as president of the Bountiful Utah Val Verda Stake of the Church of Jesus Christ of Latter-day Saints (LDS Church). Prior to his call as a stake president Siddoway had served as a bishop in the LDS Church.

== See also ==
- 54th Utah State Legislature
