= Jani Iwamoto =

American politician

Member of the Utah Senate from the 4th district
- In office January 1, 2015 – December 31, 2022
- Preceded by: Patricia W. Jones
- Succeeded by: Stephanie Pitcher (Redistricting)

Personal details
- Born: Salt Lake City, Utah, U.S.
- Party: Democratic Party
- Spouse: Steve
- Education: University of Utah; UC Davis School of Law (JD)
- Profession: Attorney

Jani Iwamoto is a former Democratic member of the Utah Senate, representing the 4th District. Previously she served as a council member of the Salt Lake County Council.

== Personal life, education, and career ==
Iwamoto was born and raised in Salt Lake County. She is a third-generation Japanese American.

She graduated from Highland High School and got a degree in mass communications from the University of Utah. She then obtained a legal degree from the UC Davis School of Law. After graduation she practiced law as a partner and litigator in northern California. After living in California for several years she moved back to Utah. Once back in Utah she became more politically active. She first began working with the No! coalition, which sought to keep high level nuclear waste out of Utah. Later she was appointed by Governor Jon Huntsman, Jr. to serve on the Central Utah Water Conservancy District Board of Trustees, and the Court of Appeals Judicial Nominating Committee. Iwamoto is married and has two children, she currently resides in Holladay, Utah.

== Political career ==
Iwamoto's first elected position was serving on the Salt Lake County Council as a councilmember. She served from 2009-2013. In 2014 she ran for the Utah State 4th district Senate seat, and won. Since 2014 she has been serving as the senator for this district. In 2018 she was elected Assistant Minority Whip by the Democrats in the Utah Senate.

In 2016, Senator Iwamoto served on the following committees in the legislature

- Executive Offices and Criminal Justice Appropriations Subcommittee
- Senate Ethics Committee
- Public Education Appropriations Subcommittee
- Senate Natural Resources, Agriculture, and Environment Committee
- Senate Economic Development and Workforce Services Committee

=== Electoral history ===
2014 Utah State Senate election District 4
Party	Candidate	Votes	%
Republican	Sabrina Peterson	13,084	40
Democratic	Jani Iwamoto	19,602	60

== Legislation ==
=== 2016 sponsored bills ===
Bill Title and Number	Bill Status
S.B. 81 Redistricting Advisory Commission	Senate/Filed for bills not passed 3/10/2016
S.B. 140 Home and Community-Based Services Amendments	Governor Signed 3/28/2016
S.B. 185 Labor Ready Amendments	Governor Signed 3/21/2016
S.B. 192 Study on Claims Exceeding Statutory Limit	Governor Signed 3/18/2016
S.B. 196 Retail Bag Impact Reduction Program	Senate/Filed for bills not passed 3/10/2016
S.C.R. 7 Concurrent Resolution Honoring Those Who Have Assisted Korean War Veterans	Governor Signed 2/12/2016
S.C.R 13 Concurrent Resolution Honoring Randy Horiuchi	Governor Signed 3/28/2016

=== Notable legislation ===
In 2016 Senator Iwamoto sponsored a bill that would have charged a dime for the use of plastic or paper bags. The bill did not pass, but Senator Iwamoto has said she will bring the bill back and attempt to pass it again during the 2017 legislative session.

== Honours ==
- Order of the Rising Sun, Gold and Silver Rays (2023)
