= Utah's 27th State Senate district =

American legislative district

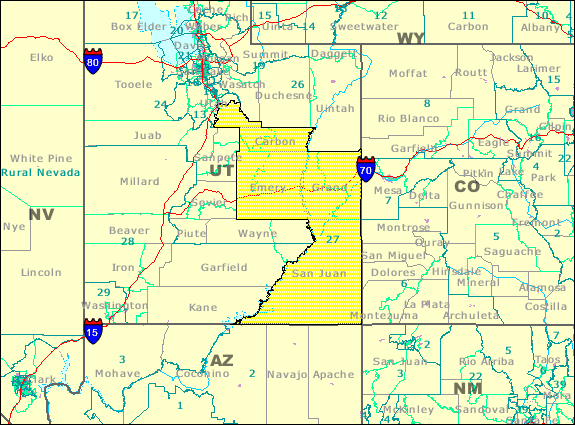
Map of the 27th Utah Senate District.

The 27th Utah Senate District is located in Carbon, Emery, Grand, San Juan and Utah Counties and includes Utah House Districts 55, 65, 66, 67, 69 and 70. The current State Senator representing the 27th district is Derrin Owens Owens. Derrin became a part of the district after a redistricting in 2023. He won the 2024 general election uncontested.

== Previous Utah State Senators (District 27) ==
Name	Party	Term
Dixie L. Leavitt	Republican	1967–1972
Omar B. Bunnell	Democratic	1973–1992

== Election results ==
=== 2004 General Election ===
Utah State Senate election, 2004
Party	Candidate	Votes	%	±%
Democratic	Mike Dmitrich	16,962	52.9	
Republican	Phillip O. Peay	14,297	44.6	
Constitution	William P. Sharp	830	2.6	

=== 2012 General Election ===
Utah State Senate election, 2012
Party	Candidate	Votes	%	±%
Democratic	Michael Binyon	9,673	27.8	
Republican	David Hinkins (Incumbent)	25,111	72.2	

=== 2016 General Election ===
Utah State Senate election, 2016
Party	Candidate	Votes	%	±%
Democratic	Heidi Redd	11,626	30.74	
Republican	David Hinkins (Incumbent)	26,199	69.26	

=== 2020 General Election ===
Utah State Senate election, 2020
Party	Candidate	Votes	%	±%
Republican	David Hinkins (Incumbent)	38,205	100	

=== 2024 General Election ===
Utah State Senate election, 2024
Party	Candidate	Votes	%	±%
Republican	Derrin Owens	41,110	100	

== See also ==
- Derrin Owens
- Utah Democratic Party
- Utah Republican Party
- Utah Senate
