= Utah's 12th State Senate district =

American legislative district

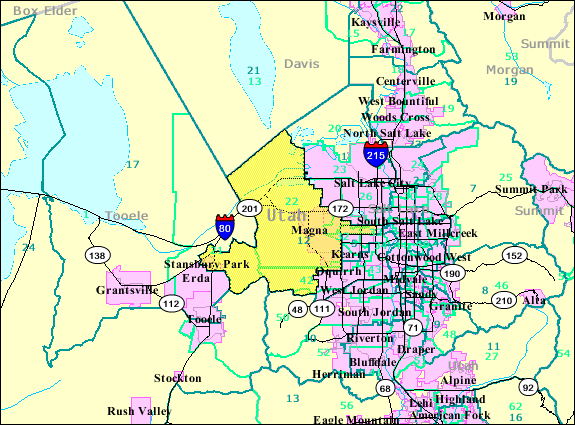
Map of the 12th Utah Senate District.

The 12th Utah Senate District is located in Salt Lake and Tooele Counties, Utah, USA, and includes Utah House Districts 21, 22, 29, 32, 33, 38, and 42.

The current State Senator representing the 12th district is Karen Kwan.

== Previous Utah State Senators (District 12) ==
Name	Party	Term
Karen Kwan	Democratic	2023– present
Karen Mayne	Democratic	2023–2023
Daniel Thatcher	Republican	2011–2022
Brent H. Goodfellow	Democratic	2005–2010
Ron Allen	Democratic	2003–2005
Millie Peterson	Democratic	1991–2002
William T. Barton	Republican	1979–1990
Carl E. Pettersson	Democratic	1973–1978
Merrill Jenkins	Democratic	1967–1972
Samuel J. Taylor	Republican	1963–1965
Charles Steen	Republican	1959–1961
Donald T. Adams	Democratic	1951–1957
Mitchell Melich	Republican	1943–1949
Byron A. Howard	Democratic	1939–1941
Wendall Peterson	Democratic	1937
W.D. Hammond	Democratic	1935
Knox Patterson	Democratic	1927–1933
Oscar W. McConkie	Democratic	1923–1925
William T. Lamph		1919–1921
Don B. Colton		1915–1917
G.A. Iverson		1911–1913
Alonzo Brinkerhoff		1907–1909
Harden Bennion	Democratic	1899–1905
M.E. Johnson		1897
Reuben G. Miller		1896

== Election results ==
=== 2006 General Election ===
Utah State Senate election, 2006
Party	Candidate	Votes	%	±%
Democratic	Brent H. Goodfellow	7,856	48.7	
Republican	Christy Achziger	7,466	46.3	
Constitution	Grant Pearson	805	5.0	

== See also ==
- Brent H. Goodfellow
- Utah Democratic Party
- Utah Republican Party
- Utah Senate
