= Luz Escamilla =

American politician (born 1978)

Minority Leader of the Utah Senate
- Incumbent
- Assumed office January 17, 2023
- Preceded by: Karen Mayne

Member of the Utah Senate
- Incumbent
- Assumed office January 1, 2009
- Preceded by: Fred J. Fife
- Constituency: 1st district (2009–2023); 10th district (2023–present)

Personal details
- Born: February 4, 1978 (age 48) Mexico
- Party: Democratic
- Spouse: Juan Carlos Escamilla
- Education: University of Utah (BS, MPA)

Luz Robles Escamilla (born February 4, 1978) is an American politician serving as a member of the Utah State Senate from the 10th District. From 2009 until 2023, she represented the 1st District and has served as the body's Minority Leader since 2023.

== Early life, education, and career ==
The daughter of two Mexican college professors, Escamilla was born in 1978 and raised in Mexico. After moving to the United States in 1996, Escamilla graduated from Marian Catholic High School in San Diego, California. She then earned her Bachelor of Science at the University of Utah in business marketing in 2000. She also holds a Master's in Public Administration, which she earned from the University of Utah in 2005.

Escamilla is a director for the Zions Bank Business Resource Center.

== Political career ==
Senator Escamilla serves as the minority leader in the Utah State Senate. Governor Jon Huntsman Jr. appointed Escamilla to the State Office of Ethnic Affairs in 2005. In 2010, she received the Salt Lake Chamber of Commerce Pathfinder Award and the SBA Award. She has also received the Pete Suazo Memorial Award from the University of Utah. Senator Escamilla has also served as a board member for the University of Utah College of Social and Behavioral Sciences, the Regence Caring Foundation, the Utah Health Policy Project, and the Primary Children's Medical Center. Escamilla was first elected to the Utah State Senate in 2008 and was re-elected in 2012. In 2016, Escamilla served on the Executive Appropriations Committee and the Social Services Appropriations Subcommittee. She also served on the following Senate standing committees:

- Senate Ethics Committee
- Senate Government Operations and Political Subdivisions Committee
- Senate Health and Human Services Committee
- Senate Judiciary, Law Enforcement, and Criminal Justice Committee.

In 2014, Escamilla ran unsuccessfully for Congress in Utah's 2nd congressional district as the Democratic Party's nominee. The seat was held by Republican incumbent Chris Stewart, who won reelection.

In 2019, Sen. Escamilla ran for mayor of Salt Lake City after Mayor Jackie Biskupski announced she would not run for another term. In the 2019 election, Escamilla lost, finishing second behind Salt Lake City Councilwoman Erin Mendenhall. She conceded the loss on November 6, 2019, one day after the race, after initial hesitation to concede in the event that mail-in ballots could affect results in the run-off election.

=== Electoral history ===
2024

Utah Senate general election, District 10
Party	Candidate	Votes	%
Democratic	Luz Escamilla (incumbent)	17,764	64.7%
Republican	Kyle W. Erb	12,688	43.5%

2020

Utah Senate general election, District 1
Party	Candidate	Votes	%
Democratic	Luz Escamilla (incumbent)	17,764	64.7%
Republican	Jim Whited	9,681	35.3%

2019

2019 Salt Lake City Mayor, general election
Candidate	Votes	%
Erin Mendenhall	26,762	57.98%
Luz Robles	19,393	42.02%

2016

Utah Senate general election, District 1
Party	Candidate	Votes	%
Democratic	Luz Escamilla (incumbent)	11,957	58.82%
Republican	Fred Johnson	8,372	41.18%

2014

Utah's 2nd Congressional District results, 2014
Party	Candidate	Votes	%
Republican	Chris Stewart (incumbent)	88,915	60.9%
Democratic	Luz Robles	47,585	32.6%
Constitution	Shaun McCausland	4,509	3.1%
American Independent	Wayne Hill	3,328	2.3%
Independent	Bill Baron	1,734	1.2%
Total votes		146,071	100%

2012

Utah Senate general election, District 1
Party	Candidate	Votes	%
Democratic	Luz Robles	10,490	55.3%
Republican	Chelsea Woodruff	8,479	44.7%

2008

Utah Senate general election, District 1
Party	Candidate	Votes	%
Democratic	Luz Robles	8,910	57.2%
Republican	Carlton Christensen	6,674	42.8%

== Legislation ==
=== 2016 sponsored bills ===
Bill number and Title	Primary Sponsor or Floor Sponsor	Status
SB48 Board Membership Restrictions	Primary	Senate/ filed 3/10/2016
SB49 Statute of Limitations on Environmental Code Violations	Primary	Senate/ to Governor 3/15/2016
SB64 Special Group License Plate Modifications	Primary	Governor Signed 3/18/2016
SB66 Environmental Code Fines	Primary	Senate/ filed 3/10/2016
SB117 Commercial Interior Design Certification	Primary	Senate/ to Governor 3/15/2016
SB125 After-School Program Amendments	Primary	Senate/ to Governor 3/17/2016

=== Notable legislation ===
During the 2011 Legislative Session, Escamilla pioneered groundbreaking immigration reform legislation, SB60, which would issue illegal immigrants already living in Utah an "accountability card," giving them the right to work without changing their legal status. Immigrants would have to pass a criminal background check and learn English to obtain the permit. Immigration experts have hailed Escamilla's immigration bill and Escamilla herself as "ground breaking" and "creative." While her SB60 did not pass, it was a model for a guest worker program that ultimately did pass the 2011 Legislature.

Escamilla has also proposed a bill that would protect the rights of fathers against fraudulent adoption practices. SB 63 would have allowed a compact of states to share punitive father's records. This would help protect father's rights if mothers took their children out of the state without the father's knowledge. The bill was not voted on the floor before Utah's 45-day session was completed.

Escamilla introduced a bill to fund the Utah Department of Environmental Quality to install air and water monitors at the site of the proposed Utah Inland Port, to establish baseline readings for future comparison. An environmental impact study of the proposed port has not been completed.

== Personal life ==
Escamilla is married to former Arizona state representative Juan Carlos Escamilla. He proposed to her on the Utah Senate floor during the 2014 legislative session. She is a member of the Church of Jesus Christ of Latter-day Saints.

== Sources ==
Utah State Senate
Preceded by Karen Mayne	Minority Leader of the Utah Senate; 2023–present	Incumbent
