= Fred J. Fife =

American politician and engineer

Fred Fife

Member of the Utah Senate from the 1st district
- In office 2004–2008
- Succeeded by: Luz Robles
- Preceded by: James Evans

Member of the Utah House of Representatives from the 26th district
- In office 1999–2002

Personal details
- Born: April 11, 1937 (age 89)
- Party: Democratic
- Spouse: Ila Rose

Fred J. Fife III (born April 11, 1937) is an American politician and engineer from Utah. A Democrat, he was a member of the Utah State Senate, representing the state's 1st senate district in Salt Lake County. Prior to his election to the State Senate, Fife served as a member of the State House from 1999 to 2002 in district 26.

Fife has a bachelor's degree from the University of Utah.
