= Dixon Pitcher =

American politician

Member of the Utah House of Representatives from the 10th district
- In office January 1, 2011 – December 31, 2018
- Preceded by: Brent Wallis
- Succeeded by: LaWanna "Lou" Shurtliff

Member of the Utah House of Representatives from the 8th district
- In office January 1, 1985 – December 31, 1986
- Preceded by: Marvin Heslop
- Succeeded by: Haynes Fuller

Personal details
- Party: Republican
- Education: Weber State College; Utah State University

Dixon M. Pitcher is an American politician. He was a Republican member of the Utah House of Representatives representing District 10 from January 1, 2011, through 2018. Pitcher was non-consecutively a Representative from January 1, 1985, until December 31, 1986, in the District 8 seat. Dixon lives in Ogden, UT, with his wife, Darlene, and their six children.

== Education ==
Pitcher earned his BA from Weber State College (now Weber State University) and his MA in political science from Utah State University.

== Political career ==
Dixon Pitcher was elected on November 2, 2010. He previously served in the Utah State House of Representatives from 1984 to 1986. During the 2016 Legislative Session, Dixon served on the Business, Economic Development, and Labor Appropriations Subcommittee, the House Business and Labor Committee, and the House Political Subdivisions Committee. Mr. Pitcher announced that he will not seek re-election

== 2016 sponsored bills ==
Bill number	Bill title	Status
HB214S02	Protective Order Modifications	House/ filed – 3/10/2016
HB0368	Short-term Rental Tax Amendments	House/ filed – 3/10/2016
HB0468	Public Utility Regulatory Restricted Account Amendments	House/ filed – 3/10/2016

Pitcher passed none of the three bills he introduced. Pitcher also floor sponsored SB0004S01 Business, Economic Development, and Labor Base Budget and SB0133S02 Small Employment Retirement Amendments.

== Elections ==
- 2014: Pitcher was unopposed in the Republican convention and ran against Democrat Eric Irvine in the general election. Pitcher won with 3,116 votes (57%) to Irvine's 2,355 votes (43%).
- 2012: Pitcher was unopposed for the June 26, 2012 Republican Primary and won the November 6, 2012 General election with 5,558 votes (54.3%) against Democratic nominee Christopher Winn.
- 2010: When District 10 incumbent Republican Representative Brent Wallis left the Legislature and left the seat open, Pitcher was unopposed for the May 8, 2010 Republican convention and won the November 2, 2010 General election with 4,229 votes (54.3%) against Democratic nominee Randy Rounds.
- 1986: Pitcher was unopposed for the 1986 Republican Primary but lost the three-way November 4, 1986 General election to Democratic nominee Haynes Fuller.
- 1984: To challenge District 8 incumbent Democratic Representative Marvin Heslop, Pitcher won the 1984 Republican Primary with 1,062 votes (53.9%) and won the November 6, 1984 General election with 4,540 votes (52.5%) against Representative Heslop.
