= David Hinkins =

American politician

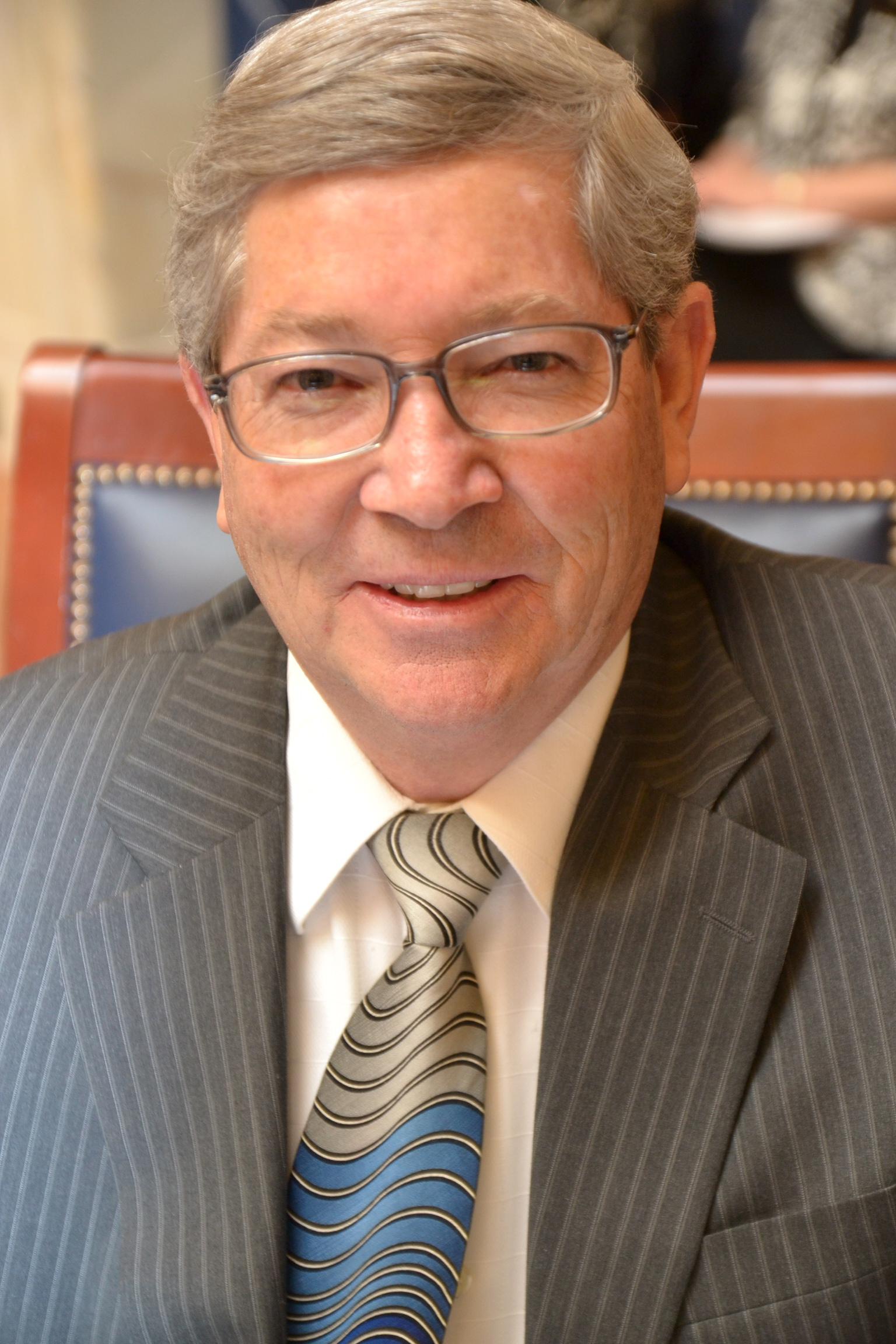
- Senator David Hinkins in 2013

Member of the Utah Senate
- Incumbent
- Assumed office January 1, 2009
- Preceded by: Mike Dmitrich
- Constituency: 27th district (2009–2023); 26th district (2023–present)

Personal details
- Party: Republican
- Education: Utah Technical College
- Profession: Businessman

David P. Hinkins is an American politician and a Republican member of the Utah State Senate representing District 26. Prior to redistricting he represented District 27. since January 1, 2009.

== Personal life, education, and career ==
Hinkins attended Emery County High School and Utah Technical College in Provo (which is now Utah Valley University). Hinkins is married and is a businessman by profession.

== Background ==
- Utah Forest Stewardship Committee
- CEU Trustee

== Political career ==
Hinkins was elected to the Senate in 2008 and began his service in 2009.

In 2016, Hinkins served on the following committees:

- Infrastructure and General Government Appropriations Subcommittee
- Natural Resources, Agriculture, and Environmental Quality Appropriations Subcommittee (Senate Chair)
- Senate Business and Labor Committee
- Senate Natural Resources, Agriculture, and Environment Committee

=== Elections ===
2024

After advancing from the 2024 Republican convention without opposition, the 2024 Republican primary for district 26 were cancelled. He faced Democratic challenger Corbin David Frost and unaffiliated candidate Oran Stainbrook in the general election, winning with 37,182 votes (69.9%).

2024 Utah State Senate election District 26
Party	Candidate	Votes	%
Republican	David Hinkins	37,182	69.9%
Democratic	Corbin David Frost	12,932	24.3%
Unaffiliated	Oran Stainbrook	3,112	5.8%

2020 No challengers filed to run against Hinkins in the primary and general elections for district 27 in 2020. In the general election, held on November 3, 2020. Unopposed, he received 38,205 votes (100%).

2020 Utah State Senate election District 27
Party	Candidate	Votes	%
Republican	David Hinkins	38,205	100%

2016 Hinkins ran unopposed in the Republican primary, which was held on June 28, 2016. In the general election, held on November 8, he defeated Democratic nominee Heidi Redd with 26,199 votes (69.3%).

2016 Utah State Senate election District 27
Party	Candidate	Votes	%
Republican	David Hinkins	26,199	69.3%
Democratic	Heidi Redd	11,626	30.7%

==== 2012 ====
Hinkins had two challengers but was selected by the Republican convention for the November 6, 2012 General election, which he won with 25,111 votes (72.2%) against Democratic nominee Mike Binyon, who had run for a House seat in 2010.

2012 Utah State Senate election District 27
Party	Candidate	Votes	%
Republican	David Hinkins	25,111	72.2%
Democratic	Michael Binyon	9,673	27.8%

==== 2008 ====
When Democratic Senator Mike Dmitrich retired and left the seat open, Hinkins ran unopposed for the June 24, 2008 Republican Primary. He then went on to win the November 4, 2008 General election with 17,693 votes (54.4%) against Democratic nominee Brad King.

2008 Utah State Senate election District 27
Party	Candidate	Votes	%
Republican	David Hinkins	17,693	54.40%
Democratic	Brad King	13,917	42.80%

== Legislation ==
=== 2016 Sponsored Legislation ===
Bill Number	Bill Title	Bill Status
S.B. 52	Rate Committee Modifications	Governor Signed 3/25/2016
S.B. 58	Nurse Practitioner Amendments	Governor Signed 3/21/2016
S.B. 69	Children's Heart Disease Special Group License Plates	Governor Signed 3/18/2016
S.B. 97	Concealed Firearms Amendments	Senate/Filed for bills not passed 3/10/2016
S.B. 110	Water Quality Amendments	Governor Signed 3/28/2016
S.B. 195	Highway Bridge Designation Amendments	Governor Signed 3/18/2016
SCR 15	Concurrent Resolution Urging Congress to Enact the Dine College Act	Governor Signed 3/18/2016
SR 1	Senate Resolution Changing a Standing Committee Name	Lt. Gov Office 2/23/2016

Floor Sponsored Legislation:

- H.B. 5 Natural Resources, Agriculture, and Environmental Quality Base Budget
- H.B. 29 Transportation Interim Committee Reports Amendments
- H.B. 84 Wildlife Amendments
- H.B. 136 Human Trafficking Amendments
- H.B. 140 Public Utilities and Technology Committee Name Change
- H.B. 211 Agricultural Exemption Amendments
- H.B. 232 Scenic Byway Amendments
- H.B. 270 Constitutional Defense Restricted Account Amendments
- H.B. 276 Utah Public Land Management Act
- H.B. 284 Injured Wildlife Amendments
- H.B. 352 Cosmetology Amendments
- H.B. 391 Law Enforcement Revisions
- H.B. 415 Motor Vehicle Accident Cost Recovery
- H.B. 420 Unmanned Vehicle Amendments
- HCR 1 Concurrent Resolution on Waters of the United States
- HCR 16 Concurrent Resolution on Utah Public Lands
- HCR 17 Concurrent Resolution Opposing Unilateral Use of the Antiquities Act
- HJR 3 Joint Rules Resolution Changing an Interim Committee Name

== Political positions ==
Hinkins voted against HB222, which would have expanded access to the National School Lunch Program, stating that it is the responsibility of parents to provide breakfast for children.
