= Dan E. Jones =

American educator and political pollster (1934–2018)

Dan E. Jones (1934-2018) was an American educator and political pollster from Utah. Jones was a Professor and Associate Director of University of Utah's Hinckley Institute of Politics from 1978 to 2013, and many of his former students are involved in Utah politics at every level. He also co-founded the public opinion polling group Dan Jones & Associates, Utah's most prominent polling firm. Kirk Jowers, former director of the Hinckley institute, has said that "Dan Jones has had the largest impact of probably anyone in Utah on civic participation."

== Personal life, education, and career ==
In 1980 Jones co-founded Dan Jones & Associates, a public opinion and market research firm. The company was acquired by Utah research and strategy firm Cicero Group in 2010. In 2015, Dan and Patricia Jones were recipients of the first "Insight Award" from nonprofit research organization Utah Foundation.

Jones had a Doctorate in Political Science from the University of Utah. He was married to Patricia W. Jones, a former politician and the current director of the Utah Women's Leadership Institute. They had four children and three step-children.

Jones died on November 2, 2018, at age 84 after a long illness. He was eulogized in a Salt Lake Tribune article as "The Oracle of Utah politics."
