= Senator McMillan =

Senator McMillan may refer to:

== Members of the United States Senate ==
- James McMillan (politician) (1838–1902), U.S. Senator from Michigan from 1889 to 1902
- Samuel J. R. McMillan (1826–1897), U.S. Senator from Minnesota from 1875 to 1887

== United States state senate members ==
- Alexander McMillan (North Carolina politician) (died 1817), North Carolina State Senate
- George McMillan (politician) (1943–2025), Alabama State Senate
- Kenneth G. McMillan (born 1942), Illinois State Senate

== See also ==
- William L. McMillen (1829–1902), Louisiana State Senate; also elected to the U.S. Senate, but not admitted
- Senator McMullen (disambiguation)
