= Riesen (surname) =

Riesen is a surname. Notable people with the surname include:

- Michel Riesen (born 1979), Swiss ice hockey player
- Nadine Riesen (born 2000), Swiss footballer
- Phil Riesen (born 1943), American politician
- House Riesen, noble house in fictional TV series, Dominion
  - Edward Riesen
  - Claire Riesen
