= The Christmas Wish =

1998 film directed by Ian Barry

- Genre: Drama
- Based on: The Christmas Wish by Richard Siddoway
- Written by: Greg Taylor
- Story by: Beth Polson
- Directed by: Ian Barry
- Starring: Neil Patrick Harris; Debbie Reynolds; Naomi Watts; Alexandra Wilson; Beverly Archer
- Music by: Alan Williams
- Country of origin: United States
- Original language: English

Production
- Executive producer: Beth Polson
- Producer: Erica Fox
- Cinematography: John C. Newby
- Editor: Janet Bartels Vandagriff
- Running time: 93 minutes
- Production company: Bonneville Worldwide Entertainment

Original release
- Network: CBS
- Release: December 6, 1998

The Christmas Wish is a 1998 American made-for-television Christmas drama film starring Neil Patrick Harris and Debbie Reynolds. It premiered on CBS on December 6, 1998, and it was based on a novel by Richard Siddoway.

== Plot ==
A businessman Will Martin tries to uncover a family secret for his grandmother Ruth Martin after he returns to a small town to modernize his family's real-estate company. During thanksgiving dinner his grandmother Ruth tells him she has discovered a woman named Lillian in her recently deceased husband Warren's journals. Warren had written about visiting Lillian every Christmas Eve since shortly after the death of his son and daughter-in-law in a car accident. The search for this mysterious Lillian takes Will on a journey through his grandfather's life and helps him to understand the true meaning of love and forgiveness.

== Cast ==
- Neil Patrick Harris as Will Martin
- Debbie Reynolds as Ruth
- Naomi Watts as Renee
- Alexandra Wilson as Julia
- Beverly Archer as Miss Enid Cook
- Ian Meltzer as Justin
- Gary Bayer as Jimmy Hanning
- James Greene as Warren Martin
- Jerry Douglas as Mr. Askou

== See also ==
- List of Christmas films
