= Robert M. Muhlestein =

American politician (born 1965)

Robert M. Muhlestein (born October 10, 1965) is a former Republican member of the Utah State Senate who represented the Provo area from 1997 to 2001.

Muhlestein is currently the CEO of Harmony Educational Services.

Muhlestein defeated longtime Democratic senator Eldon Money in 1996. While he was in the state senate, Muhlestein was identified as a resident of Benjamin, Utah.

Muhlestein was the principal of the American Leadership Academy in Spanish Fork, Utah. In 2007, he was hired as a consultant by Liberty Academy in Salem, Utah to help get it into good financial shape.

== See also ==
- 54th Utah State Legislature
