= Joseph Edward Taylor =

American politician

Joseph E. Taylor
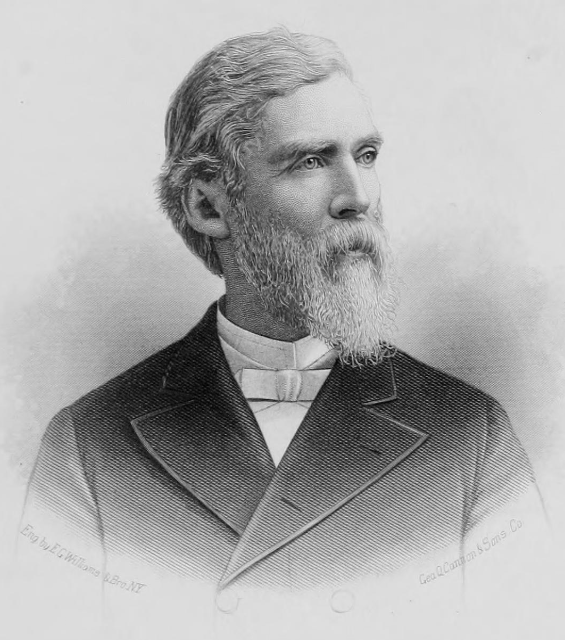

Member of the Utah House of Representatives from the 8th district
- In office January 11, 1897 – January 8, 1899

Personal details
- Born: December 11, 1830 Horsham, Sussex, England
- Died: February 13, 1913 (aged 82) Salt Lake City, Utah, United States
- Resting place: Salt Lake City Cemetery; 40.777°N 111.858°W
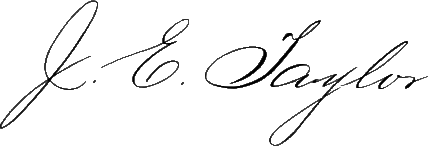
- Signature

Joseph Edward Taylor (December 11, 1830 – February 13, 1913) was a member of the Utah House of Representatives and the leading Sexton in Salt Lake City.

== Biography ==
Taylor was born in Horsham, Sussex, England to George Edward Grove Taylor and his wife the former Ann Wicks. He was raised in Tetbury, Gloucestershire, England. At age fifteen he moved to Hull, Yorkshire, England. He joined The Church of Jesus Christ of Latter-day Saints at this place in 1846. In 1848 he began serving as an LDS missionary in England. In January 1851 he left England to come to Utah. But he fell ill in St. Louis and did not come to Utah until 1852. He originally worked as a cabinet maker and set up his undertaking business in 1862.

In 1875 Taylor went on a mission to Nebraska, Iowa and Illinois. Beginning in 1876 he served for many years as the second counselor to Angus M. Cannon in the presidency of the Salt Lake Stake, which at the time covered all of Salt Lake County. Taylor became first councillor in the Salt Lake Stake presidency in 1884. Taylor was elected to the Utah State House of representatives in 1896.

In 1904 the Salt Lake Stake was divided into four stakes and Taylor was released from the presidency. He was then called as a patriarch.

Taylor had four wives. He had 10 children with his first wife, Louisa Rebecca Capener. Among his children by another of his wives, Lisadore Williams, was Alma O. Taylor, who was a key figure in the start of the Japanese Mission of the LDS Church.

== Sources ==
- Compton, Todd M. A Widow's Tale: The 1884-1896 Diary of Helen Mar Kimball Whitney. (Logan: Utah State University Press, 2003) Notes, p. 728.
- Deseret News, February 18, 1913, obituary of Joseph Edward Taylor
- Orson F. Whitney. History of Utah. Vol. 4, p. 488.
- Jenson, Andrew (1901). Latter-day Saint biographical encyclopedia: A compilation of biographical sketches of prominent men and women in the Church of Jesus Christ of Latter-Day Saints. Vol. 1. Salt Lake City, Utah: The Andrew Jenson History Company (Printed by The Deseret News Press). p. 295.
