= Brent H. Goodfellow =

American politician and educator

Brent Goodfellow

Member of the Utah Senate from the 12th district
- In office 2006–2011
- Preceded by: Ron Allen
- Succeeded by: Daniel Thatcher

Member of the Utah House of Representatives from the 30th district
- Succeeded by: Janice Fisher

Personal details
- Born: August 16, 1940 (age 85)
- Party: Democratic
- Spouse: Gayle
- Occupation: Businessman

Brent H. Goodfellow (born 16 August 1940) is an American politician and educator from Utah.

He is a Democrat, and a former member of the Utah State Senate, representing the state's 12th senate district in Salt Lake and Tooele Counties.

Goodfellow is an alumnus of the University of Utah.
