= Patricia W. Jones =

American politician from Utah (born 1950)

Patricia W. "Pat" Jones
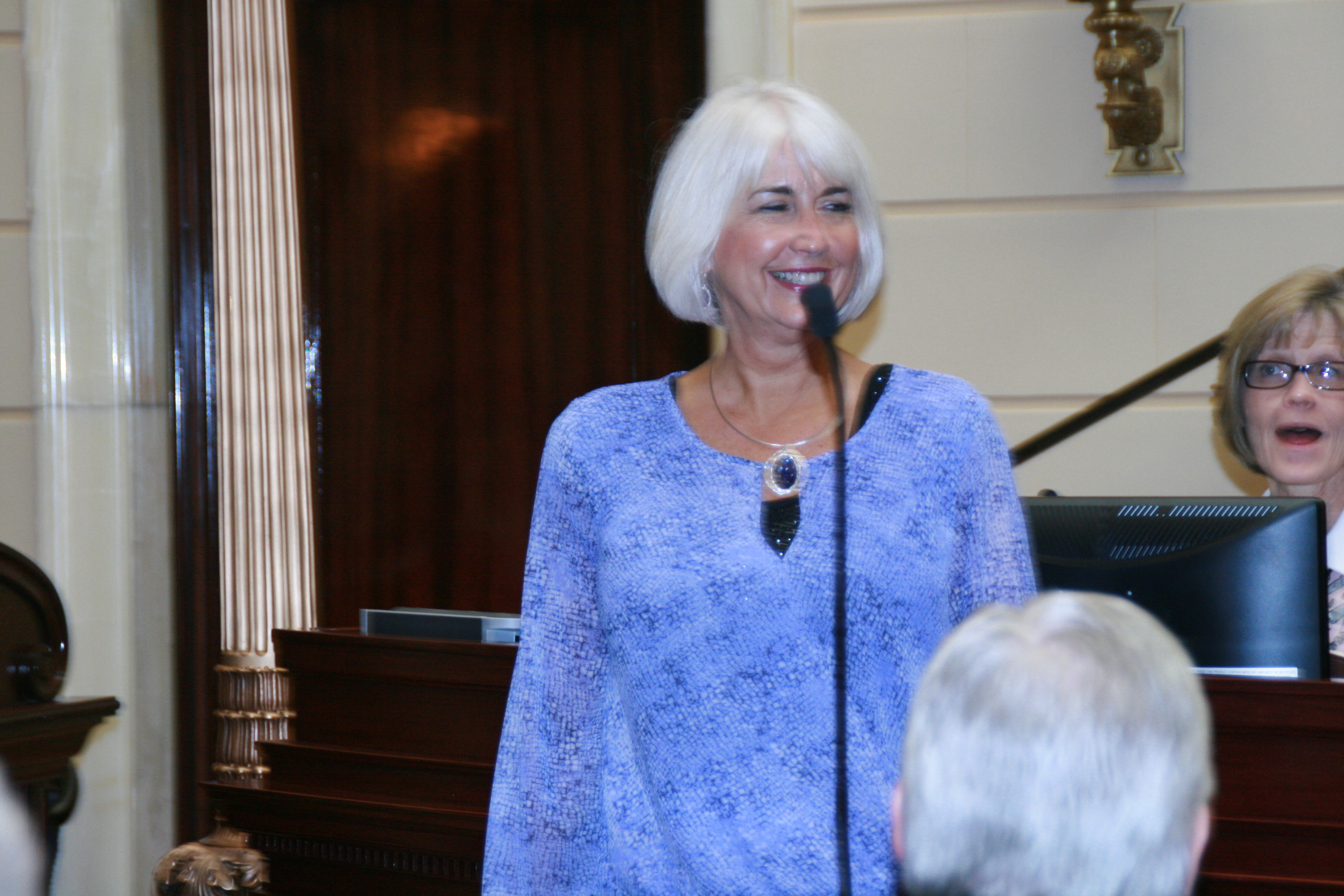

Member of the Utah Senate from the 4th district
- In office 2006–2014
- Preceded by: Patrice M. Arent
- Succeeded by: Jani Iwamoto

Personal details
- Born: January 31, 1950 (age 76)
- Party: Democratic
- Spouse: Dan Jones
- Occupation: politician

Patricia W. "Pat" Jones (born January 31, 1950) is an American politician from Utah. A Democrat, she was a member of the Utah State Senate from 2006 to 2014, and currently runs the Women’s Leadership Institute in Utah. She is also senior adviser at Cicero Group, a research and strategy firm in Salt Lake City.

== Personal life, education, and career ==
Jones has a bachelor's degree in journalism from the University of Utah. She was married to the late Dan E. Jones, who was a former pollster and political science professor at the University of Utah. They have four children and three step-children.

Jones was president of Dan Jones & Associates, a public opinion and market research firm incorporated in 1980. Pat Jones is professionally trained in qualitative research and as a focus group moderator. She received her training from the Oregon Research Institute. She is a member of the National Qualitative Research Consultants Association.

== Background ==
- Gov. Commission on Education
- Native American Liaison Interim Commission
- Info Tech Steering Commission
- Boards:

Salt Lake Chamber of Commerce
United Way
St. Mark's Hospital
Hale Centre Theater
Women's Prosperity Network
Intermountain Healthcare Foundation

- Awards:

Titan Business Excellence
Legislator of the Year (UT Pharmacists Assn.)
Athena Award
U of U Alumni Achievement
Public Health Hero
Hero on the Hill (Coalition for People with Disabilities)
Women on the Move (Utah Business)
Eleanor Roosevelt award
Friend of Children (PTA)

== Political career ==
Jones represented the state's 4th senate district in Salt Lake County from 2006-2014. She previously served in the Utah House of Representatives from 2002 to 2006, representing District 40. In 2014, she served as the Assistant Minority Whip in the Utah Senate. She has also served as the minority leader. Jones serves on Health Committee of National Conference of State Legislatures. Senator Jones has also served on the United Way Board of Governors, Salt Lake Council for the Aging, Salt Lake Chamber of Commerce, South Valley Boys and Girls Club, and Understanding Chemical Addictions Boards. Throughout her political career, Senator Jones has been named the 2006 Hero on the Hill by the People with Disabilities, one of "30 Top Women in Business" by Utah Business Magazine 2002 and Utah's 2002 Public Health Hero by Utah Health Magazine.

In 2014, Senator Jones served on the following committees:

- Executive Appropriations Committee
- Higher Education Appropriations Subcommittee
- Public Education Appropriations Subcommittee
- Senate Economic Development and Workforce Services Committee
- Senate Education Committee
- Senate Ethics Committee
- Senate Judiciary, Law Enforcement, and Criminal Justice Committee
- Senate Rules Committee

Senator Jones sponsored S.B. 108 Civil Rights Amendments Relating to Persons with a Disability in 2013. This bill follows in the footsteps of the Americans with Disabilities Act of 1990 (ADA) by recognizing that, historically speaking, Utah and the United States have actively and passively discriminated against these individuals for no other reason than they are disabled.

=== Election results ===
Utah State Senate election Dis. 4, 2006
| Party | Candidate | Votes | % | ±% |
|---|---|---|---|---|
| Republican | Dirk Anjewierden IV | 11,211 | 46 | |
| Democratic | Patricia Jones | 14,274 | 56 | |

== 2014 sponsored legislation ==
| Bill number and Title | Primary or Floor Sponsor | Bill status |
|---|---|---|
| S.B. 40 Substitute Financial and Economic Literacy Amendments | Primary | Governor Signed 3/27/2014 |
| S.B. 115 Court Transcript Fees | Primary | Governor Signed 4/1/2014 |
| S.B. 118 Substitute School Funding Through Income Tax Revisions | Primary | Senate/filed 3/13/2014 |
| S.B. 147 Fourth Substitute Residential Rental Amendments | Primary | Governor Signed 4/1/2014 |
| S.C.R. 3 Concurrent Resolution on the School of Dentistry Serving Underprivileged Children | Primary | Governor Signed 3/25/2014 |
| H.B. 290 Criminal Code - General Provisions | Floor; Primary Rep. Moss | Governor Signed 3/27/2014 |
| H.B. 321 Refugee Services Coordination Amendments | Floor; Primary Rep. Menlove | Governor Signed 3/27/2014 |
| H.B. 333 Payroll Services Amendments | Floor; Primary Rep. Spendlove | House/filed 3/13/2014 |
| H.J.R. 9 Joint Resolution on Utah Epilepsy Public Education, Outreach, and Awareness | Floor; Primary Rep. Poulson | Enrolled 2/18/2014 |
