= James Evans (Utah politician) =

American political executive and businessman (born 1962)

Chair of the Utah Republican Party
- In office 2013–2017
- Preceded by: Thomas Wright
- Succeeded by: Rob Anderson

Member of the Utah State Senate from the 1st district
- In office 2002–2004
- Succeeded by: Fred J. Fife

Personal details
- Born: 1962 (age 63–64) Orangeburg, South Carolina, U.S.
- Party: Republican
- Education: Tuskegee University (BS)

James Evans is an American political executive and businessman who served as Chair of the Utah Republican Party from 2013 to 2017, the first African-American to serve in the role. Evans previously served as the first African-American Utah State Senator.

== Early life and education ==
Evans was born and raised in Orangeburg, South Carolina. He graduated from Orangeburg-Wilkinson High School before earning a Bachelor of Science in Chemical Engineering from Tuskegee University.

== Career ==
Evans served in the United States Air Force, reaching the rank of captain. He owned a payday lending franchise called Chekline. Evans served as a member of the Utah State Senate from 2002 to 2004, representing the 1st district.

After serving as Chair of the Utah Republican Party for four years, Evans was defeated for re-appointment and succeeded by Rob Anderson. Evans had faced mounting pressure to resign amid a lawsuit against his business and growing financial debts.
