= Daniel Thatcher =

American politician

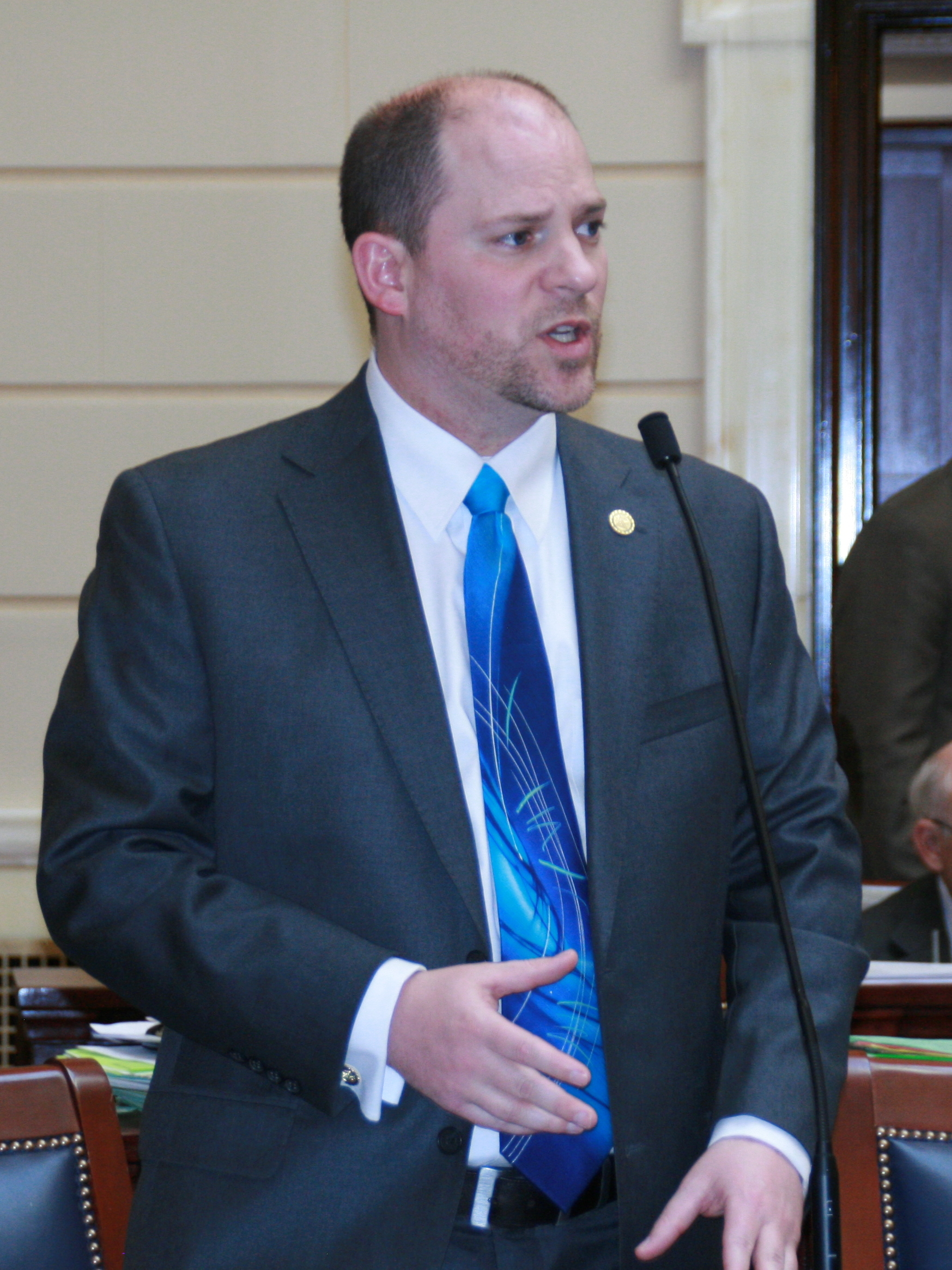
- Thatcher in 2014

Member of the Utah Senate
- In office January 1, 2011 – December 12, 2025
- Preceded by: Brent H. Goodfellow
- Succeeded by: Emily Buss
- Constituency: 12th district (2011–2023); 11th district (2023–2025)

Personal details
- Born: July 12, 1976 (age 50) West Valley City, Utah, U.S.
- Party: Forward (since 2025)
- Other political affiliations: Republican (2010–2025)

Daniel W. Thatcher (born July 12, 1976) is an American politician who served as a member of the Utah State Senate from 2011 to 2025. He was a member of the Republican caucus from then until he registered with the Forward Party in 2025. He represented District 11 and, prior to redistricting, District 12.

== Personal life, education, and career ==
Thatcher was born and raised in West Valley City. Thatcher's official biography describes him as self-educated. His profession is in electronics and low voltage wiring.

== Political career ==
Senator Thatcher began his political pursuits when he co-founded the Salt Lake County Young Republicans. He was the chapter's first chair. He is also a co-founder of West Side Matters and has held various elected positions in the Salt Lake County Republican Party.

- 2010 To challenge incumbent Democratic Senator Brent H. Goodfellow, Thatcher was selected by the Republican convention from two candidates for the November 2, 2010 General election, which he won with 9,432 votes (53.25%) against Senator Goodfellow.

During the 2016 Session, Thatcher served on the following committees:

- Executive Offices and Criminal Justice Appropriations Subcommittee (Senate Chair)
- Public Education Appropriations Subcommittee
- Retirement and Independent Entities Appropriations Subcommittee
- Senate Government Operations and Political Subdivisions Committee
- Senate Health and Human Services Committee
- Senate Judiciary, Law Enforcement, and Criminal Justice Committee
- Senate Retirement and Independent Entities Committee

In October 2025, Thatcher announced his intent to resign before the beginning of the next legislative session in January 2026. To select a successor the Utah Forward Party organized a district-wide election in December 2025; the winner, Emily Buss, was chosen through online approval voting.

== Elections ==
=== 2010 ===
2010 Utah State Senate election District 12
Party	Candidate	Votes	%
Republican	Daniel Thatcher	9,432	53.25
Democratic	Brent H. Goodfellow (incumbent)	8,281	46.75

=== 2014 ===
2014 Utah State Senate election District 12
Party	Candidate	Votes	%	±%
Republican	Daniel Thatcher (incumbent)	8,548	58.8%	▲5.55
Democratic	Clare Collard	5,998	41.2%	

=== 2018 ===
2018 Utah State Senate election District 12
Party	Candidate	Votes	%	±%
Republican	Daniel Thatcher (incumbent)	13,835	50.38%	▼8.42
Democratic	Clare Collard	12,400	45.16%	▲3.96
Green	Abrian B. Velarde	1,225	4.46%	

=== 2022 ===
Utah's 11th Senate District general election, 2022
Party	Candidate	Votes	%
Republican	Daniel Thatcher (incumbent)	24,680	100.00%
Total votes		24,680	100.00%
Republican hold			

== Legislation ==
=== 2016 sponsored bills ===
Bill number and Title	Bill status
S.B. 94 Law Enforcement Use of Body Cameras	Senate/Filed for bills not passed 3/10/2016
S.B. 124 Gang Enhancement Provision Amendments	Governor Signed 3/21/2016
S.B. 157 Pawnshop Amendments	Senate/To Governor 3/17/2016
S.B. 187 Reclassification of Misdemeanors	Governor Signed 3/25/2016

=== Notable legislation ===
In 2015, the School Safety and Crisis Line legislation (SB 175), sponsored by Thatcher and Rep. Steve Eliason, passed the Utah State Legislature designating UNI (University Neuropsychiatric Institute, now Huntsman Mental Health Institute) as the crisis provider and an active commission, chaired out of the attorney general's office, for implementation. Thatcher chose to sponsor the legislation after recognizing the statewide epidemic that had personally impacted him numerous times throughout his life.
