= Utah's 25th State Senate district =

American legislative district

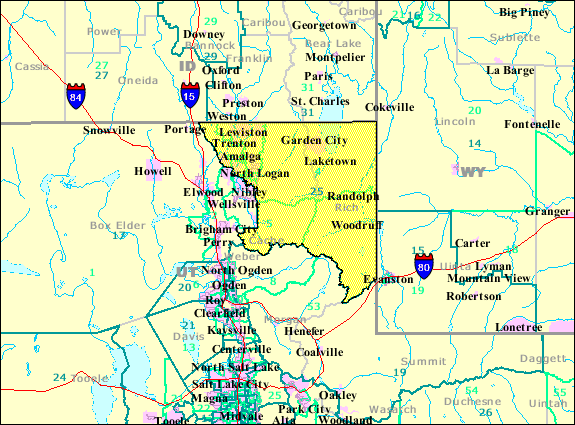
Map of the 25th Utah Senate District.

The 25th Utah Senate District is located in Cache and Rich Counties and includes Utah House Districts 2, 3, 4, 5, and 53. The current State Senator representing the 25th district is Mike McKell. McKell was elected to the Utah Senate in 2022 and assumed office on January 1, 2023. His predecessor Chris Wilson was elected in 2020.

== Previous Utah State Senators (District 25) ==
Name	Party	Term
Chris H. Wilson	Republican	2020-2023
Lyle W. Hillyard	Republican	1985-2020
Charles W. Bullen	Republican	1977–1984
Reed Bullen	Republican	1973–1976
Karl G. Swan	Democratic	1971–1972
Ernest G. Mantes	Democratic	1967–1970

== Election results ==
=== 2004 General Election ===
Utah State Senate election, 2004
Party	Candidate	Votes	%	±%
Republican	Lyle W. Hillyard	24,756	77.2	
Democratic	Matthew W. Everett	7,329	22.8	

=== 2020 General Election ===
Utah State Senate election, 2020
Party	Candidate	Votes	%	±%
Republican	Chris H. Wilson	32,667	71.42	
Democratic	Nancy Huntly	13,075	28.58	

== See also ==
- Lyle W. Hillyard
- Utah Democratic Party
- Utah Republican Party
- Utah Senate
- Mike McKell
