= List of Utah state legislatures =

This is a list of legislatures of Utah since statehood in 1896.

== Utah State Legislatures ==
=== 1st – 10th Utah State Legislatures ===
- 1st Utah State Legislature: January 13, 1896 — January 10, 1897
- 2nd Utah State Legislature: January 11, 1897 — January 8, 1899
- 3rd Utah State Legislature: January 9, 1899 — January 13, 1901
- 4th Utah State Legislature: January 14, 1901 — January 11, 1903
- 5th Utah State Legislature: January 12, 1903 — January 8, 1905
- 6th Utah State Legislature: January 9, 1905 — January 13, 1907
- 7th Utah State Legislature: January 14, 1907 — January 10, 1909
- 8th Utah State Legislature: January 11, 1909 — January 8, 1911
- 9th Utah State Legislature: January 9, 1911 — January 12, 1913
- 10th Utah State Legislature: January 13, 1913 — January 10, 1915

=== 11th – 20th Utah State Legislatures ===
- 11th Utah State Legislature: January 11, 1915 — January 7, 1917
- 12th Utah State Legislature: January 8, 1917 — January 12, 1919
- 13th Utah State Legislature: January 13, 1919 — January 9, 1921
- 14th Utah State Legislature: January 10, 1921 — January 7, 1923
- 15th Utah State Legislature: January 8, 1923 — January 11, 1925
- 16th Utah State Legislature: January 12, 1925 — January 9, 1927
- 17th Utah State Legislature: January 10, 1927 — January 13, 1929
- 18th Utah State Legislature: January 14, 1929 — January 11, 1931
- 19th Utah State Legislature: January 12, 1931 — January 8, 1933
- 20th Utah State Legislature: January 9, 1933 — January 13, 1935

=== 21st – 30th Utah State Legislatures ===
- 21st Utah State Legislature: January 14, 1935 — January 10, 1937
- 22nd Utah State Legislature: January 11, 1937 — January 8, 1939
- 23rd Utah State Legislature: January 9, 1939 — January 12, 1941
- 24th Utah State Legislature: January 13, 1941 — January 10, 1943
- 25th Utah State Legislature: January 11, 1943 — January 7, 1945
- 26th Utah State Legislature: January 8, 1945 — January 12, 1947
- 27th Utah State Legislature: January 13, 1947 — January 9, 1949
- 28th Utah State Legislature: January 10, 1949 — January 7, 1951
- 29th Utah State Legislature: January 8, 1951 — January 11, 1953
- 30th Utah State Legislature: January 12, 1953 — January 9, 1955

=== 31st – 40th Utah State Legislatures ===
- 31st Utah State Legislature: January 10, 1955 — January 13, 1957
- 32nd Utah State Legislature: January 14, 1957 — January 11, 1959
- 33rd Utah State Legislature: January 12, 1959 — January 8, 1961
- 34th Utah State Legislature: January 9, 1961 — January 13, 1963
- 35th Utah State Legislature: January 14, 1963 — January 10, 1965
- 36th Utah State Legislature: January 11, 1965 — January 8, 1967
- 37th Utah State Legislature: January 9, 1967 — January 12, 1969
- 38th Utah State Legislature: January 13, 1969 — January 10, 1971
- 39th Utah State Legislature: January 11, 1971 — January 7, 1973
- 40th Utah State Legislature: January 8, 1973 — January 12, 1975

=== 41st – 50th Utah State Legislatures ===
- 41st Utah State Legislature: January 13, 1975 — January 9, 1977
- 42nd Utah State Legislature: January 10, 1977 — January 7, 1979
- 43rd Utah State Legislature: January 8, 1979 — January 11, 1981
- 44th Utah State Legislature: January 12, 1981 — January 9, 1983
- 45th Utah State Legislature: January 10, 1983 — January 13, 1985
- 46th Utah State Legislature: January 14, 1985 — January 11, 1987
- 47th Utah State Legislature: January 12, 1987 — January 8, 1989
- 48th Utah State Legislature: January 9, 1989 — January 13, 1991
- 49th Utah State Legislature: January 14, 1991 — January 17, 1993
- 50th Utah State Legislature: January 18, 1993 — January 15, 1995

=== 51st – 60th Utah State Legislatures ===
- 51st Utah State Legislature: January 16, 1995 — January 19, 1997
- 52nd Utah State Legislature: January 20, 1997 — January 17, 1999
- 53rd Utah State Legislature: January 18, 1999 — January 14, 2001
- 54th Utah State Legislature: January 15, 2001 — January 19, 2003
- 55th Utah State Legislature: January 20, 2003 — January 16, 2005
- 56th Utah State Legislature: January 17, 2005 — January 14, 2007
- 57th Utah State Legislature: January 15, 2007 — January 20, 2009
- 58th Utah State Legislature: January 26, 2009 — January 23, 2011
  - 2010: January 25–March 11, 2010
- 59th Utah State Legislature: January 24, 2011 — January 27, 2013
  - 2011: January 24–March 10, July 27, October 3, 2011
  - 2012: January 23–March 8, 2012
- 60th Utah State Legislature: January 28, 2013 — January 25, 2015
  - 2013: January 28–March 14, 2013
  - 2014: January 27–March 14, 2014

=== 61st – 70th Utah State Legislatures ===
- 61st Utah State Legislature: January 26, 2015 — January 22, 2017
  - 2015: January 26–March 12, August 19, 2015
  - 2016: January 25–March 10, May 18, 2016
- 62nd Utah State Legislature: January 23, 2017 — January 28, 2019
  - 2017: January 23–March 9, September 20, 2017
  - 2018: January 22–March 8, 2018
- 63rd Utah State Legislature: January 28, 2019 – January 19, 2021
  - 2019: January 28–March 14, 2019
  - 2020: January 27–March 12, 2020
- 64th Utah State Legislature: January 19, 2021 – January 17, 2023
  - 2021: January 19–March 5, 2021
  - 2022: January 18–March 4, 2022
- 65th Utah State Legislature: January 17, 2023 – January 21, 2025
  - 2023: January 17, 2023 to March 3, 2023
  - 2024: January 16, 2024 to March 1, 2024
- 66th Utah State Legislature: January 21, 2025 – January 19, 2027
  - 2025: January 21, 2025 to March 7, 2025
  - 2026: January 20, 2026 to March 6, 2026
- 67th Utah State Legislature: January 19, 2027 –
  - 2027: January 19, 2027 to March 5, 2027

== See also ==
- Utah Territorial Legislative Assembly
- List of governors of Utah
- History of Utah
- Lists of United States state legislative sessions
