= Parley G. Hellewell =

American politician

Member of the Utah Senate from the 15th district
- Succeeded by: Margaret Dayton

Personal details
- Born: February 1, 1950 (age 76) Burley, Idaho, U.S.
- Party: Republican

Parley G. Hellewell (born February 1, 1950) was a Republican member of the Utah State Senate from 1999 to 2006.

Hellewell was born in Burley, Idaho and raised in Heyburn, Idaho. He served a mission for the LDS Church in Germany and then attended Utah Valley State College (now Utah Valley University) where he got a degree in business management and marketing.

Hellewell worked for Taylor's Department Store in Provo, Utah for several years before starting up his own property management company. He created PPM in 1979 as a property management company which he later turned into a Plumbing repair company. This company is still a thriving business in Orem, Utah that now provides Heating and Cooling Installation and Service.

He was first elected to the Utah State Senate in 1998. He was defeated by Margaret Dayton in 2006 in the Utah County Republican Party Convention.

Hellewell was one of the Republican candidates for governor at the 2004 State Republican convention coming in 6th with 122 votes.

== See also ==
- 54th Utah State Legislature

== Sources ==
- Campaign page for Hellewell
