= Patrice Arent =

American politician (born 1956)

Patrice M. Arent

Member of the Utah House of Representatives from the 36th district
- Incumbent
- Assumed office 1997-2002, 2010-2020
- Preceded by: Phil Riesen
- Succeeded by: Doug Owens

Member of the Utah Senate from the 4th district
- In office 2002–2006
- Succeeded by: Patricia W. Jones

Personal details
- Born: February 3, 1956 (age 70)
- Party: Democratic
- Education: University of Utah (BS); Cornell Law School (JD)

Patrice M. Arent (born February 3, 1956) is an American politician who served as a Democratic member of the Utah House of Representatives, representing the state's 36th house district through 2020.

== Early life and career ==
Arent was born February 3, 1956, in Utah. She received her B.S. from the University of Utah in 1978 and her J.D. from Cornell Law School in 1981. Before becoming a member of the House of Representatives, she worked as an Assistant Attorney General in the Utah Attorney General's Office from 1989 to 1995. She currently lives in Salt Lake City with her husband and two children. She is Jewish.

== Political career ==
Arent was elected to the Utah House of Representatives in 1996 where she has served as Democratic Whip and Assistant Democratic Whip. In 2002, because of legislative redistricting, she would have had to run against another incumbent Democratic representative to remain in her House seat. Rather than run for a fourth term in the House, Arent successfully ran to represent District 4 in the State Senate. She served in the Utah Senate from 2003 through 2006.

Arent was elected Democratic National Committeewoman from Utah at the 2008 State Democratic Convention. She represented Utah as a "superdelegate" at the 2008 Democratic National Convention in Denver, Colorado, and helped nominate Barack Obama as the Democratic candidate for President of the United States.

In 2010, she returned to public office as the Representative of District 36 in the Utah House of Representatives. She was reelected in 2012 with 60% of the vote. She was reelected in 2014 with 67.8% of the vote.

In 2011, the Utah Democratic Party awarded her the Eleanor Roosevelt Award. The award was presented on October 27, 2011, at This is the Place Heritage Park in Salt Lake City, Utah. She was selected by a committee of past award winners. Past award winners include former Congresswoman Karen Shepherd and State Senator Karen Mayne.

During the 2016 legislative session, Arent served on the Executive Appropriations Committee, the Business, Economic Development, and Labor Appropriations Subcommittee, the House Government Operations Committee, and the House Public Utilities, Energy, and Technology Committee.

== 2016 sponsored legislation ==
Bill number	Bill title	Status
HB0052S02	Office of Outdoor Recreation Amendments	Governor Signed - 3/21/2016
HB0119	Straight Ticket Voting Amendments	House/ filed - 3/10/2016
HB0130	Electric Vehicle Infrastructure Amendments	Governor Signed - 3/29/2016
HB0158S01	Campaign Funds Restrictions for County and Local School Board Offices	Governor Signed - 3/18/2016
HB0237	Income Tax Contribution for Clean Air	Governor Signed - 3/21/2016
HB0267	Charitable Solicitation Act Amendments	Governor Signed - 3/29/2016
HB0275	Submission of Nonbinding Opinion Questions to Voters	House/ filed - 3/10/2016
HJR006	Joint Rules Resolution on Ethics Commission	House/ filed - 3/10/2016

Arent passed five of the eight bills she introduced, giving her a 62.5% passage rate. She did not floor sponsor any bills during the 2016 general session.
