= Frances Farley =

American politician (1923–2004)

Member of the Utah Senate from the 1st district
- Succeeded by: Karen Shepherd

Personal details
- Born: Grand Forks, North Dakota
- Party: Democratic Party
- Spouse: Gene Farley
- Children: 2
- Education: University of North Dakota, New York University

Frances Farley (August 27, 1923 – January 16, 2004) was a Democratic member of the Utah State Senate, representing the state's Senate District 1.

== Early life and education ==
Farley was born August 27, 1923, in Grand Forks, North Dakota. She received a bachelor's degree in business administration from the University of North Dakota, and then went to New York University, and earned a master's degree in marketing.

== Political career ==
After moving to Utah, Farley was elected a delegate to the 1972 Democratic National Convention.

In 1976, Farley was elected to the Utah State Senate as a Democrat. At that time, Democrats were the majority party in the Utah Senate. She served in the Utah Senate until 1982. While in the state legislature, Farley was active in opposing deployment of the MX missile in Utah and Nevada. She also advocated for women in Utah. Her protest against the University Club's male-only policy began a movement which led to the end of such policies in private clubs in Utah.

Farley ran twice for a seat in the United States Congress in Utah's 2nd District. The first run was in 1982, against incumbent Rep. Dan Marriott (R-Utah). The second run, in 1984, against Lt. Gov. David S. Monson, was very close: Farley lost by only 472 votes.

Farley returned to the Utah State Senate for one more term in 1986, and retired from the legislature in 1990. She encouraged other women in Utah, including her successor in Utah Senate District 1, Karen Shepherd, to run for office. In 1991, Farley was elected to the Common Cause National Governing Board. Frances Farley died in 2004 from Alzheimer's Disease.
