= Lyle W. Hillyard =

American politician

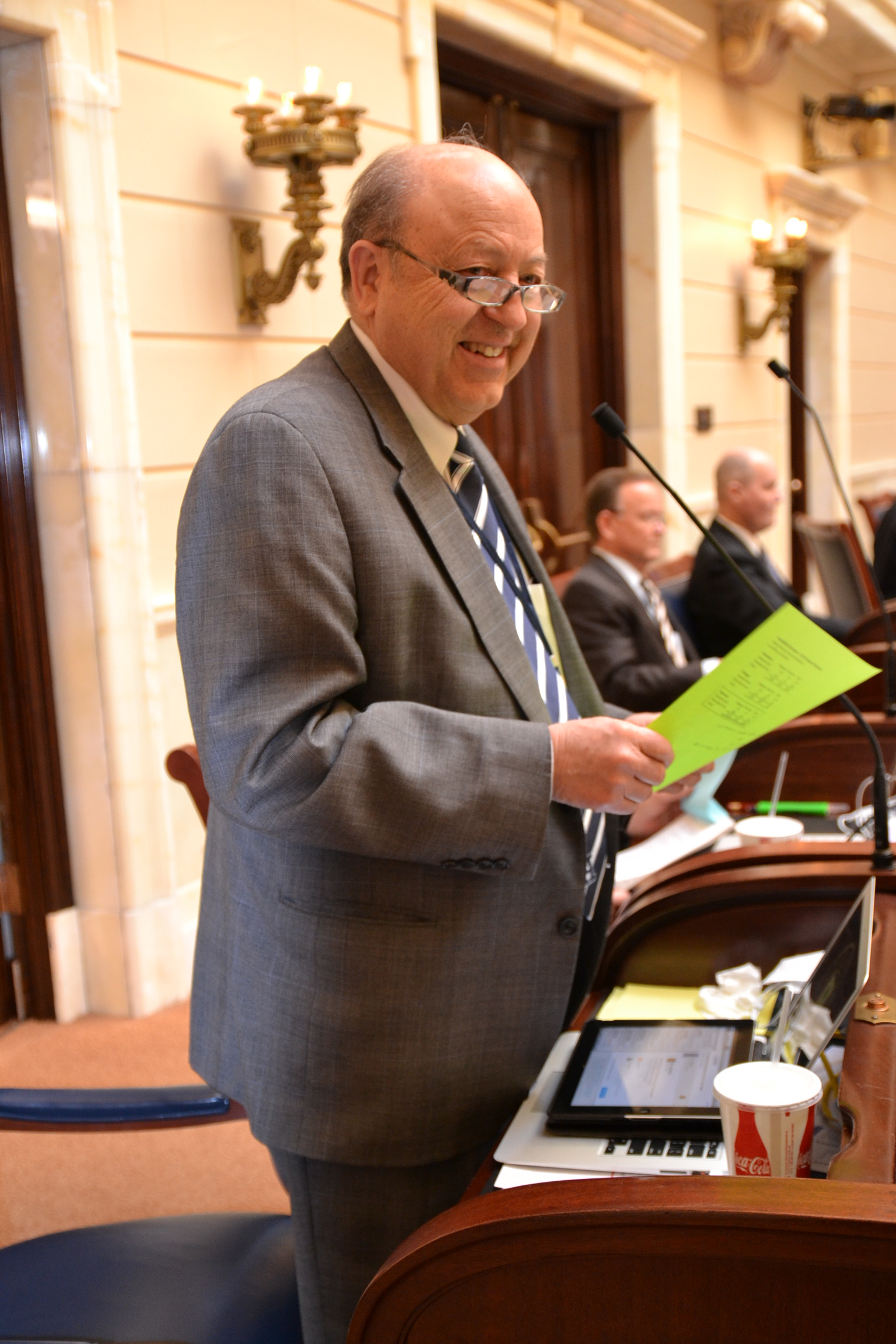
- Hillyard in February 2013

Member of the Utah Senate from the 25th district
- In office January 1, 1985 – December 31, 2020
- Preceded by: Charles W. Bullen
- Succeeded by: Chris H. Wilson

Member of the Utah House of Representatives from the 58, 4 district
- In office January 1, 1981 – December 31, 1984

Personal details
- Born: September 25, 1940 (age 85)
- Party: Republican
- Spouse: Alice
- Occupation: Attorney

Lyle W. Hillyard (born September 25, 1940) is a Utah politician and an attorney. A Republican, he was a member of the Utah State Senate, representing the state's 25th senate district in Cache and Rich Counties including the city of Logan. He served in the legislature from 1981 to 2020, first as a representative from 1981 to 1984, then as a senator from 1985 to 2020.

== Early life, education, and career ==
Hillyard is a graduate of North Cache High School and Utah State University. He also got his J.D. from the University of Utah College of Law. Hillyard is a lawyer by profession. He works at Hillyard, Anderson & Olsen law offices, which has been providing legal representation to clients across northern Utah since the 1960s.

Hillyard is married to his wife Alice and they have 5 Children: Carrie, Holly, Lisa, Matt, and Todd. Hillyard is a member of the Church of Jesus Christ of Latter-day Saints.

== Background ==
- Cache Chamber of Commerce (past president)
- Cache County Republican Party (chair)
- Utah Education Strategic Planning Commission
- Utah State Office of Education (vice chair)
- Utah Highway Patrol (Honorary Colonels )
- ALEC voted one of eight outstanding state legislators

== Political career ==
Senator Hillyard was first elected to the House in 1980. He was elected to the Senate in 1984 and has served there since. He won the 2012 American Cancer Society Legislator of the Year, the most effective Republican freshman by the Utah House in 1981 and was named one of eight outstanding legislators by ALEC in 1987. Hillyard is currently the Executive Appropriations Committee Chair and has been since 2009.

In 2016, Senator Hillyard served on the following committees:

- Executive Appropriations Committee (Senate Chair)
- Infrastructure and General Government Appropriations Subcommittee
- Public Education Appropriations Subcommittee
- Senate Government Operations and Political Subdivisions Committee
- Senate Judiciary, Law Enforcement, and Criminal Justice Committee

=== Election ===
Senator Hillyard was up for reelection in 2020 and lost against Chris Wilson in the Republican Primary.

2020 Republican primary: Utah State Senate election District 25
Party	Candidate	Votes	%
Republican	Chris Wilson	11,283	62.7%
Republican	Lyle Hillyard	6,725	37.3%

=== Legislation ===
==== 2016 sponsored bills ====
Bill number	Bill title	Bill status
S.B. 2	Public Education Budget Amendments	Governor Item Lined Veto 3/30/2016
S.B. 3	Current Fiscal Year Supplemental Appropriations	Governor Signed 3/30/2016
S.B. 7	National Guard, Veterans' Affairs, and Legislature Base Budget	Governor Signed 2/16/2016
S.B 40	Utah Revised Nonprofit Corporation Act Amendments	Governor Signed 3/18/2016
S.B. 91	Board of Education Amendments	Governor Signed 3/23/2016
S.B. 96	Uniform Deployed Parents Custody and Parent-time Act	Governor Signed 3/25/2016
S.B. 100	Traffic Fines Amendments	Senate/Filed for bills not passed 3/10/2016
S.B. 105	Bail Amendments	Governor Signed 3/23/2016
S.B. 119	Debt Collection Amendments	Governor Signed 3/21/2016
S.B. 179	Uniform Parentage Act Amendments	Senate/Filed for bills not passed 3/10/2016
S.B. 180	Optional Tax Increase Amendments	Senate/Filed for bills not passed 3/10/2016
S.B. 181	Judiciary Amendments	Governor Signed 3/17/2016
S.B. 202	Pre-trial Release Amendments	Senate/Filed for bills not passed 3/10/2016
S.B. 206	Cohabitant Abuse Procedures Act Revisions	Governor Signed 3/16/2016
S.J.R. 8	Joint Rules Resolution on Performance Notes	Senate/To Lieutenant Governor 2/29/2016
S.J.R. 9	Joint Rules Resolution on Request for Appropriations Process Change	Senate/Filed for bills not passed 3/10/2016

==== Notable legislation ====
In 2014, Senator Hillyard Sponsored S.B. 205 Controlled Substance Penalty Amendment, which made it so that in certain circumstances, those with illegal substances would not be charged with anything more than a second degree felony. This encourages people who are using illegal substances to call 911 if someone with them overdoses or gets hurt without the fear of getting in trouble.
