= Millie Peterson =

American politician (1944–2020)

Member of the Utah State Senate from the 12th district
- In office January 1, 1991 – January 1, 2003
- Preceded by: William T. Barton
- Succeeded by: Ron Allen

Personal details
- Born: June 11, 1944 Merced, California
- Died: March 30, 2020 (aged 75) Salt Lake City, Utah
- Party: Democratic

Millie Marion Peterson (June 11, 1944 – March 30, 2020) was an American politician who served in the Utah State Senate from the 12th district from 1991 to 2003.

She died on March 30, 2020, in Salt Lake City, Utah at age 75.
