= Mike Dmitrich =

American politician (1936–2024)

Member of the Utah Senate from the 27th district
- In office January 18, 1993 – 2009
- Preceded by: Omar B. Bunnell
- Succeeded by: David P. Hinkins

Personal details
- Born: Milan Dmitrasnovic; October 23, 1936 Murray, Utah, U.S.
- Died: September 30, 2024 (aged 87) Mesquite, Nevada, U.S.
- Party: Democratic Party
- Spouse: Bo
- Occupation: Natural Resources Consultant

Mike Dmitrich (born Milan Dmitrasnovic; October 23, 1936 – September 30, 2024) was an American politician and Natural Resource Consultant from Utah. A Democrat, he served as a member of the Utah State Senate, representing the state's 27th senate district in Price. Dmitrich served as the Minority Leader in the Utah Senate. Prior to being elected to the Utah Senate Dmitrich served in the State House from 1969 to 1992. He retired prior to the 2008 elections and was replaced by David P. Hinkins.

Dmitrich attended the College of Eastern Utah and Utah State University.

Dmitrich died on September 30, 2024, at the age of 87.
