= Utah's 1st State Senate district =

American legislative district

Senator
Scott Sandall; R–Tremonton

Utah's 1st State Senate district is one of 29 Utah State Senate districts. It covers all of Box Elder County and parts of Cache and Tooele Counties. The current State Senator is Republican Scott Sandall.

== History ==
The first Senate district of Utah was created in 1896 when Utah was admitted as a state. Abraham Zundel of Willard was elected to serve as the first Senator for District 1 in a special election held on November 5, 1895, but wasn't subsequently re-elected in the 1896 election. The district has undergone several major changes as a result of re-districting, originally representing Box Elder and Tooele counties instead of present-day Salt Lake County. Because of this the second Senator to represent the 1st District was William G. Nebeker of Ophir in Tooele County while the first was from Willard in Box Elder County.

W. Hughes Brockbank, a Republican, was elected president of the National Legislative Conference in 1969 becoming the first Utahn to hold this office.

Terry Lee Williams, a Democrat from Salt Lake City, served in the Utah State Senate from 1983 to 1986 thus becoming the first African American to serve in the State Senate. Williams was originally elected to the Utah State House of Representatives and served from 1981 to 1982 but was preceded by Reverend Robert Harris of Ogden in 1976 as the first African American to serve in the state legislature.

Williams unsuccessfully sought the Democratic nomination for the U.S. Senate in 1986. Craig Oliver, a real estate salesman, defeated Terry Williams in a tight primary election. Williams garnered 14,385 votes, or 49.55% to Oliver's 14,646 votes, or 50.45% for a vote difference of 261. Oliver faced off against Republican incumbent Jake Garn.

Frances Farley, a Democrat, served as Senator for District 1 from 1976 to 1982 being the first woman to be elected to the Utah Senate in 20 years. Farley unsuccessfully ran for Congress in 1982 and 1984 before again mounting a successful run for State Senate in District 1 in 1986. Farley was an advocate for women's rights and according to the Deseret News,

[Farley] staged a news conference blasting the University Club for not allowing her into its sports grill. The protest launched a movement that eventually led decades-old male-only private clubs to open memberships to women.

Farley retired from the Utah Senate in 1990.

Karen Shepherd, a Democrat, served as state senator for District 1 from 1991 to 1992. She was subsequently elected to represent Utah's 2nd congressional district in the U.S. House when Wayne Owens chose to run unsuccessfully for the U.S. Senate. Robert Steiner, a Democrat, replaced her as state senator. Steiner, the great-grandson of Utah's U.S. Senator Thomas Kearns was a former part owner of the Salt Lake Tribune and heir of the Steiner American Linen Corporation. Steiner retired from the Senate in 1999.

Steiner purchased Jon Huntsman, Jr's. home when he became Governor of Utah.

Shepherd represented the 2nd congressional district from 1993 to 1995. Shepherd was the first female Senator to represent Utah in Congress since Reva Beck Bosone (1949–1953) who was the first female Congresswomen to represent Utah in the U.S. House. There has been no female U.S. Senator from Utah.

Fred J. Fife of Salt Lake City was elected to represent District 1 in 2004. Fife was defeated at the state Democratic Convention by Luz Robles. Robles went on to win the general election, defeating Salt Lake City Councilman Carlton Christensen, winning 56% of the vote.

In 2023, Utah's State Senate districts were renumbered, and District 1 moved from Salt Lake County to Box Elder, Cache, and Tooele counties.

=== Historical Boundaries ===
Note: This information may not be complete. Please add additional information and sources.

Counties	Dates
Box Elder, Tooele	1896–1967
Salt Lake	1967 – 2023
Box Elder, Cache, Tooele	2023 – present

=== Previous State Senators (District 1) ===
Name	Party	Term
Scott Sandall	Republican	2023–present (redistricted from the 17th district)
Luz Escamilla	Democratic	2009-2023 (redistricted to the 10th district)
Fred J. Fife	Democratic	2004–2008
James M. Evans	Republican	2003–2004
Paula F. Julander	Democratic	1999–2002
Robert C. Steiner	Democratic	1993–1999
Karen Shepherd	Democratic	1991–1992
Frances Farley	Democratic	1987–1990
Terry Lee Williams	Democratic	1983–1986
Frances Farley	Democratic	1977–1982
W. Hughes Brockbank	Republican	1967–1976
David R. Waldron	Democratic	1965
Kleon Kerr	Republican	1957–1963
Clifton G.M. Kerr	Republican	1953–1955
J. Harold Reese	Democratic	1949–1951
J. Welton Ward	Democratic	1945–1947
Abel S. Rich	Democratic	1941–1943
Will R. Holmes	Democratic	1937–1939
Albert E. Holmgren	Republican	1933–1935
Tracy R. Welling		1929–1931
John W. Peters		1921–1927
Archibald Bevan		1917–1919
Willard Snow Hansen		1913–1915
William C. Horsley		1909–1911
Peter Clegg		1905–1907
H.S. Larsen		1901–1903
William G. Nebeker		1897–1899
Abraham Zundel		1896

== Election results ==
=== 2004 election ===
Utah State Senate election, 2004
Party	Candidate	Votes	%	±%
Democratic	Fred J. Fife	7,981	48.9	
Republican	James Evans	7,553	46.2	
Constitution	Elaine Jenkins	463	2.8	
Personal Choice	Daniel D. McGuire	338	2.1	

=== 2008 election ===
Utah State Senate election, 2008
Party	Candidate	Votes	%	±%
Democratic	Luz Robles	8,004	56.47%	+7.57%
Republican	Carlton Christensen	6,170	43.53%	−2.67%

=== 2012 election ===
Utah State Senate election, 2012,
Party	Candidate	Votes	%	±%
Democratic	Luz Robles	10,490	55.3%	
Republican	Chelsea Woodruff	8,479	44.7%	

== Current candidates ==
This seat is not currently up for election in the 2010 election but will be up for election in the 2012 election.

== See also ==
- Luz Robles
- Utah Democratic Party
- Utah Republican Party
- Utah Senate

Preceded by James M. Evans	Fred J. Fife; 2005 – present	Succeeded by Incumbent
