= Rosalind McGee =

American community activist and legislator

Rosalind Toy "Roz" McGee (née Johnson; August 16, 1937 – June 16, 2015) was a community activist and legislator.

Born in Chapel Hill, North Carolina, McGee went to Agnes Scott College and then received her bachelor's degree from University of North Carolina at Chapel Hill. McGee was active in several communities where she, her husband Zell, and the family had lived. McGee lived in Salt Lake City, Utah was executive director for Utah Voices for Children. From 2003 to 2008, McGee served in the Utah House of Representatives and was a Democrat. McGee died in Chapel Hill, North Carolina.
