= Utah's 15th State Senate district =

American legislative district

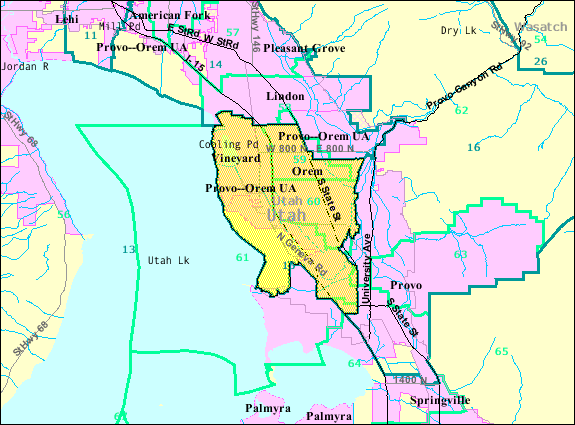
Map of the 15th Utah Senate District.

The 15th Utah Senate District is located in Utah County and includes Utah House Districts 58, 59, 60, 61, 62 and 64.

== Previous Utah state senators (District 15) ==
Name	Party	Term
Parley G. Hellewell	Republican	1999–2006
LeRay L. McAllister	Republican	1983–1999
A. Dean Jeffs	Republican	1973–1982
Ernest H. Dean	Democratic	1967–1972
Byron R. Rampton	Republican	1965
Haven J. Barlow	Republican	1957–1963
Rendell N. Mabey	Republican	1953–1955
James E. Burns	Democratic	1949–1951
Ward C. Holbrook	Democratic	1945–1947
William A. Dawson	Republican	1941–1943
Lloyd Riley	Republican	1939
Ward C. Holbrook	Democratic	1933–1937

== Election results ==
=== 2006 general election ===
Utah state senate election, 2006
Party	Candidate	Votes	%	±%
Republican	Margaret Dayton	11,365	68.6	
Democratic	Bethanie Newby	4,169	25.2	
Constitution	Gordon Mela	1,028	6.2	

== See also ==
- Utah Democratic Party
- Utah Republican Party
- Utah Senate
