= Marda Dillree =

American politician (1945–2009)

Member of the Utah House of Representatives from the 17th district
- In office January 1, 1993 – December 31, 2004
- Succeeded by: Julie Fisher

Personal details
- Born: May 25, 1945 Santa Rosa, California
- Died: October 22, 2009 (aged 64) Farmington, Utah
- Party: Republican

Marda Dillree (May 25, 1945 – October 22, 2009) was an American politician who served in the Utah House of Representatives from the 17th district from 1993 to 2004.

She died of cancer on October 22, 2009, in Farmington, Utah at age 64.
