= LaWanna Shurtliff =

American politician (1935–2020)

Member of the Utah House of Representatives from the 10th district
- In office January 1, 2019 – December 30, 2020
- Preceded by: Dixon Pitcher
- Succeeded by: Rosemary Lesser
- In office January 1, 1999 – January 1, 2009
- Preceded by: Patricia B. Larson
- Succeeded by: C. Brent Wallis

Personal details
- Born: LaWanna Miles; June 13, 1935 Afton, Wyoming, U.S.
- Died: December 30, 2020 (aged 85) Ogden, Utah, U.S.
- Party: Democratic
- Spouse: Bob Shurtliff (m. 1957; died 2018)
- Children: 2
- Education: Utah State University (BS)

LaWanna Miles "Lou" Shurtliff (June 13, 1935 – December 30, 2020) was an American politician who served in the Utah House of Representatives from 1999 through 2008, and was elected again in 2018. She had just won her 2020 election before her unexpected death, and never took office for that term.

== Early life and education ==
Born LaWanna Miles in Afton, Wyoming, Shurtliff graduated from Star Valley High School in 1953. Shurtliff earned a BS in business and English education from Utah State University in 1957.

== Career ==
Shurtliff was an English teacher at Roy Junior High School from 1957 to 1959 and a business and accounting teacher at Ogden High School from 1966 to 1994. Shurtliff became a teachers' union leader, first as president of the Ogden Education Association then director of the Utah Education Association.

Shurtliff was asked last minute by the Weber County Democratic Party to run for the Utah State Senate. Shurtliff lost by under 200 votes and garnered 49.92%.

In 1998 Pat Larsen was retiring from her seat in the Utah House of Representatives in District 10. Shurtliff ran to succeed her friend Pat and won against Republican Bill Turner. Shurtliff had held the District 10 seat, from 1999 through 2008, and was last elected in 2006 to the seat, which covers southern Ogden and South Ogden. She did not seek reelection after that last term. During her time in the legislature from 1999 to 2008 Shurtliff passed legislation related to assisting victims of domestic violence, establishing some of the first stalking injunctions in the country and increasing funding for Utah schools and teachers.

Three days before the 2018 filing ended Shurtliff was approached by two Weber State University students who asked her to run for her old seat in House District 10, offering to manage her campaign. She filed the next day and was the only Democrat to file for that race. In the 2018 general election, she defeated Republican candidate Lorraine Brown, with 53.89% of the vote. Shurtliff is the first Democrat to win a Utah House race in Weber County since Neil Hansen won the District 9 race in 2008. During the 2019 session Shurtliff sponsored multiple pieces of legislation that addressed substance abuse and justice reform. Lou Shurtliff also voted against SB 96 that altered the medicaid expansion initiative that passed in 2018. She credited her vote against altering the initiative due to her district voting over 60% in favor of it and "respecting the will of the people". Shurtliff had just won a narrow race in 2020 against Republican Travis Campbell (51%) before her unexpected death.

Shurtliff was also a founding executive committee member to the group Weber County Forward.

== Personal life ==
LaWanna Shurtliff married Bob Shurtliff in 1957; Bob died in 2018. They had two children, Scot and Stacy, and raised them in Roy, Utah. LaWanna died on December 30, 2020, at the age of 85, in Ogden, Utah, after suffering from pneumonia.
