= Dix H. McMullin =

American politician (1933–2008)

Member of the Utah Senate from the 5th district
- In office 1983–1992

Member of the Utah House of Representatives
- In office 1976–1982

Personal details
- Born: November 30, 1933 South Jordan, Utah, United States
- Died: November 5, 2008 (aged 74) South Jordan, Utah, United States
- Party: Republican
- Profession: Educator

Dix Holt McMullin (November 30, 1933 – November 8, 2008), was an American politician who was a Republican member of the Utah House of Representatives and Utah State Senate. McMullin was an alumnus of the University of Utah, holding a Bachelor of Science, Master of Science and doctor of philosophy (Ph.D.) degrees. He was an educator. He died of cancer in 2008. McMullin was those involved in the early consultations that lead to the formation of the Utah Boys Ranch.
