= Robert Harris (Utah politician) =

American politician (died 2005)

Member of the Utah House of Representatives
- In office 1976–1978

Personal details
- Died: 2005
- Party: Democratic
- Occupation: Politician, activist, businessman

Robert Harris (died 2005) was an American politician and civil rights activist who was the first African American to serve in the Utah State Legislature. A Democrat from Ogden, Utah, he was elected to the Utah House of Representatives in November 1976 and served one term before losing reelection in 1978. He marched in dozens of protests for peace and civil rights and was arrested over 97 times.

== Life and career ==
Harris arrived in Ogden, Utah, in 1956, when he opened the town's first Black-owned grocery store and a barbecue restaurant. He was a minister of the Church of God in Christ and preached every other Sunday at the Utah State Prison. He marched in dozens of protests for peace and civil rights in Utah and California, including 39 antiwar protests in the 1960s and 1970s. In November 1976, he became the first Black person elected to the Utah State Legislature. He was elected to represent Weber County in the Utah House of Representatives and served one term before losing reelection in 1978. On November 14, 1979, he conducted a solo protest against the Ku Klux Klan at the state capitol. Harris died in 2005.
