= Chad Bennion =

American politician

Member of the Utah House of Representatives from the 44th district
- In office January 1, 1999 – December 31, 2004
- Succeeded by: Tim Cosgrove

Personal details
- Born: September 6, 1964 (age 61) Murray, Utah
- Party: Republican

Chad Bennion (born September 6, 1964) is an American politician who served in the Utah House of Representatives from the 44th district from 1999 to 2004.
