= Utah's 5th State Senate district =

American legislative district

The 5th Utah Senate District is located in Salt Lake County, Utah. The current State Senator representing the 5th district is Karen Mayne. Mayne was appointed to the Utah Senate on January 16, 2008, to fill a seat that was recently vacated when her husband Senator Ed Mayne died. Mayne won her re-election bid on November 4, 2008, against Republican candidate Jonathan Fidler and Constitution candidate James E. Peverelle, Jr.

== History ==
The 2001 Utah State Legislature passed legislation redistricting Utah's Senate Districts. This legislation took effect during the 2002 General election and Ed Mayne became the Senator for the current 5th Senate District. Prior to the 2002 General Election he represented Senate District 11 from 1995 to 2002.

Ed Mayne died on Sunday, November 25, 2007. His wife Karen Mayne was appointed to replace him.

== Previous Utah State Senators (District 5) ==
| Name | Party | Term |
|---|---|---|
| Ann Milner | Republican | 2022-Present |
| Karen Mayne | Democratic | 2008–Present |
| Ed Mayne | Democratic | 2003–2007 |
| Brent C. Richards | Republican | 1993–1995 |
| Dix H. McMullin | Republican | 1983–1992 |
| James F. Considine | Democratic | 1982 |
| Arthur L. Kimball | Democratic | 1977–1981 |
| Donald G. Brooke | Democratic | 1973–1976 |
| Douglas G. Bischoff | Republican | 1971–1972 |
| C. Taylor Burton | Republican | 1967–1970 |
| Gordon E. Harmston | Democratic | 1963–1965 |
| Bennie Schmiett | Democratic | 1961 |
| Glen M. Hatch | Democratic | 1957–1959 |
| B. H. Stringham | Republican | 1953–1955 |
| Lynn Orser | Democratic | 1949–1951 |
| H. Grant Vest | Democratic | 1945–1947 |
| Lynne Ashton | Democratic | 1941–1943 |
| G. Victor Billings | Democratic | 1937–1939 |
| Hyrum B. Calder | Democratic | 1933–1935 |
| Ray E. Dillman | | 1929–1931 |
| Thomas W. O'Donnell | | 1925–1927 |
| William H. Smart | | 1921–1923 |
| James W. Clyde | | 1917–1919 |
| L. B. Wight | | 1913–1915 |
| James B. Wilson | | 1909–1911 |
| Frederick Rasband | | 1905–1907 |
| Joseph R. Murdock | | 1901–1903 |
| Robert C. Chambers | | 1896–1899 |

== Election results ==
=== 2008 General Election ===
Utah State Senate election, 2008
| Party | Candidate | Votes | % | ±% |
|---|---|---|---|---|
| Democratic | Karen Mayne | 13,676 | 67.27 | −32.73 |
| Republican | Jonathon Fidler | 6,641 | 32.67 | 32.67 |
| Write-In | Unknown | 13 | 0.06 | 0.06 |

=== 2006 General Election ===
Utah State Senate election, 2006
| Party | Candidate | Votes | % | ±% |
|---|---|---|---|---|
| Democratic | Ed Mayne | 10,067 | 100.0 | |

== Current Candidates ==
Note: See footnote for candidate listing guidelines.

| District | Party | Incumbent | Status | Party | Candidate | Votes | % | Change from 2008 |
|---|---|---|---|---|---|---|---|---|
| 5 | Democratic | Karen Mayne (Salt Lake County) | Running | Constitution | James E. Peverelle, Jr. | | | |
| 5 | Democratic | Karen Mayne (Salt Lake County) | Running | Democratic | Karen Mayne | | | |
| 5 | Democratic | Karen Mayne (Salt Lake County) | Running | Republican | Samuel Fidler | | | |

== See also ==
- Karen Mayne
- Utah Democratic Party
- Utah Republican Party
- Utah Senate

| Preceded by Ed Mayne | Karen Mayne; 2008 - Present | Succeeded by |
