= William T. Barton =

American politician (born 1933)

Member of the Utah Senate from the 12th district
- In office 1979–1990

Personal details
- Born: February 18, 1933 (age 93) Granger, Utah, U.S.
- Party: Republican
- Spouse: Karen Larson Barton
- Profession: businessman

William Thomas Barton (born February 18, 1933) is an American retired politician who was a Republican member of the Utah State Senate. A businessman, he attended the University of Utah and Utah Technical College.
