= Ed Mayne =

American politician (1945–2007)

Member of the Utah Senate from the 5th district
- In office 1995–2007
- Preceded by: Brent C. Richards
- Succeeded by: Karen Mayne

Personal details
- Born: September 16, 1945 Bingham Canyon, Utah, U.S.
- Died: November 25, 2007 (aged 62) West Valley City, Utah, U.S.
- Party: Democratic
- Spouse: Karen Mayne
- Occupation: President – AFL-CIO Utah
- Website: Personal Website

Eddie Paul Mayne (September 16, 1945 – November 25, 2007) was an American politician from Utah. A Democrat, he was a member of the Utah State Senate, representing the state's 5th senate district in West Valley City.

== Early life and education ==
Mayne studied at Snow College and the University of Utah. He worked for Kennecott Utah Copper in the Bingham Canyon Mine after his first year in college.

== Labor leader ==
In 1977, at age 31, he became the youngest person to win election to the state presidency of the AFL-CIO, a position he held until his death.

== Politics ==
Mayne was first elected to the Utah State Senate in 1994. He rose to the position of Assistant Minority Whip.

== Death and tributes ==
Mayne was diagnosed with lung cancer in the spring of 2007, and died on November 25, 2007, at his home.

On September 19, 2008, the Hunter High School football stadium, in West Valley City, Utah, was named 'Ed Mayne Stadium' for his support in getting funding for stadium lights as well as for other athletics in the school.
