= Karen Mayne =

American politician (1946–2024)

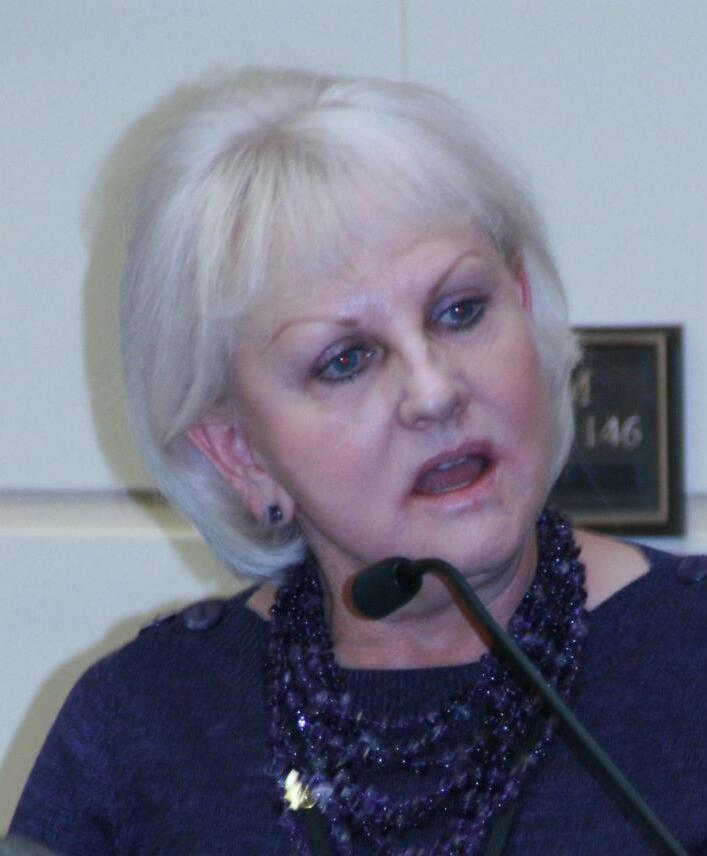
- Mayne in 2013

Minority Leader of the Utah Senate
- In office January 28, 2019 – January 16, 2023
- Preceded by: Gene Davis
- Succeeded by: Luz Escamilla

Member of the Utah Senate
- In office January 2, 2008 – January 16, 2023
- Preceded by: Ed Mayne
- Succeeded by: Karen Kwan
- Constituency: 5th district (2008–2023); 12th district (2023)

Personal details
- Born: Karen Marie Hibler; April 6, 1946 Salt Lake City, Utah, U.S.
- Died: August 15, 2024 (aged 78)
- Party: Democratic
- Spouse: Ed Mayne (died 2007)
- Children: 2
- Education: Stevens-Henager College

Karen Mayne (April 6, 1946 – August 15, 2024) was an American politician who served as a member of the Utah Senate from the 5th District. She assumed office on January 2, 2008, succeeding her husband, Ed Mayne. She won re-election for the 12th senate district after redistricting. On January 4, 2023 Karen Mayne announced her plan to resign office due to unexpected changes in her health. Delegates of the Utah Democratic Party held a special election on January 15, 2023, electing Representative Karen Kwan to fill her seat.

== Early life and education ==
Mayne was born in Salt Lake City. She was a graduate of Chamber West Leadership Center and attended Henagers Business College.

== Career ==
Mayne worked as a para-educator for 20 years in the Granite School District. Throughout her career in education, she won the Para-educator of the Year, the American Federation of Teachers, the Lucy Beth Rampton Award for Community Service, and the Service to Community Award.

Before her position as senator, Mayne was active in her local PTA, baseball and football organizations, and numerous political and community activities.

Upon the death of her husband, Senator Ed Mayne, in 2007, Mayne was appointed to his senate seat. She was then elected in 2008 and 2010 as a Democrat. In 2014, she served as the Assistant Minority Whip, and beginning in 2015 she has served as the Senate Minority Whip.

During her service as senator, Mayne has won a number of awards, including the Elenor Roosevelt Distinguished Woman of the Year Award, Legislator of the Year Award From Salt Lake Community College, Utah School Nurse Association Appreciation Award, "Hero on the Hill," from the Legislative Coalition for People with Disabilities, Firefighters' Legislator of the Year, Workers Compensation Fund President's Award, the Sunshine Award (given for protection of free speech and open government), Salt Lake Chamber of Commerce's Business Champion of 2013, and the Award of Excellence in Workplace Safety and Health presented by the Rocky Mountain Center.

== Personal life and death ==
Mayne had two children and six grandchildren. She was a lifelong resident of the West side of Salt Lake Valley. Mayne was a member of the Methodist Church.

In January 2022, Mayne was hospitalized after falling at her home and suffered from a head and shoulder injury. She was later diagnosed with cancer while receiving treatment for her injuries. Mayne died on August 15, 2024, at the age of 78.

== Election results ==
In 2014 Mayne was unopposed in the primary. During the general election she had a challenger who dropped out before the election and won unopposed.

=== 2008 ===
Utah State Senate election Dis. 5, 2008
Party	Candidate	Votes	%	±%
Republican	Jonathan Fidler	6,641	32.7	
Democratic	Karen Mayne	13,676	67.3	

=== 2010 ===
Utah State Senate election Dis. 5, 2010
Party	Candidate	Votes	%	±%
Republican	Samuel Fidler	4,705	38	
Democratic	Karen Mayne	8,492	62	

== Legislation ==
=== Notable legislation ===
In 2014, Mayne sponsored S.B. 36, which only allows certain groups, such as political parties and health care providers, to access voter birth dates. It also restricts their use of that information for verifying identities or political purposes, such as urging support for a candidate. The Governor signed this bill into law.

In 2016 Mayne sponsored a bill which will create a feasibility study to determine how postal service workers can be utilized to aid with emergency response efforts. This bill was supported by Representative Jason Chaffetz as part of his effort to make the postal service more universal.

Utah State Senate
Preceded by Gene Davis	Minority Leader of the Utah Senate; 2019–2023	Succeeded by Luz Escamilla
