= Utah's 4th State Senate district =

American legislative district

The 4th Utah Senate District is located in Salt Lake County and includes Utah House Districts 36, 37, 40, 44, 45, and 46. The current State Senator representing the 4th district is Calvin "Cal" Musselman. He has been serving since January 1st, 2025.

== Previous Utah State Senators (District 4) ==
Name	Party	Term
David G. Buxton	Republican	2023-2024
Jani Iwamoto	Democratic	2015-2022
Pat Jones	Democratic	2006–2014
Patrice M. Arent	Democratic	2003–2006
Howard A. Stephenson	Republican	1993–2002
Scott N. Howell	Democratic	1991–1992
Richard B. Tempest	Republican	1987–1990
Wayne L. Sandberg	Republican	1979–1986
Richard C. Howe	Democratic	1973–1978
Grant A. Whitman	Democratic	1969–1972
Wallace L. Burt	Republican	1967–1968
Frank M. Browning	Democratic	1959–1966

== Election results ==
=== 2024 General Election ===
2024 Utah State Senate election District 4
Party	Candidate	Votes	%
Republican	Calvin Musselman	38,687	100

=== 2018 General Election ===
2018 Utah State Senate election District 4
Party	Candidate	Votes	%
Democratic	Jani Iwatamoto	34,651	67.1
Republican	Alan Monsen	17,000	32.9

=== 2014 General Election ===
2014 Utah State Senate election District 4
Party	Candidate	Votes	%
Republican	Sabrina Peterson	13,084	40
Democratic	Jani Iwamoto	19,602	60

=== 2010 General Election ===
2010 Utah State Senate election District 4
Party	Candidate	Votes	%
Democratic	Patricia Jones	15,189	56.3
Republican	Doug Greer	11,783	43.7

=== 2006 General Election ===
2006 Utah State Senate election District 4
Party	Candidate	Votes	%
Democratic	Patricia Jones	14,274	56.01
Republican	Dirk Anjewierden	11,211	43.99

== See also ==
- Calvin "Cal" Musselman
- David Gregg Buxton
- Jani Iwamoto
- Pat Jones
- Utah Democratic Party
- Utah Republican Party
- Utah Senate
