= 58th Utah State Legislature =

The 58th Utah State Legislature was elected Tuesday, November 5, 2008 and convened on Monday, January 26, 2009.

== Dates of sessions ==
- 2009 General Session: January 26, 2009 - March 12, 2009

== Leadership ==
=== Senate ===
- President of the Senate: Michael G. Waddoups (R-6)

Majority (Republican) Leadership

- Majority Leader: Sheldon Killpack (R-21)
- Majority Whip: Scott K. Jenkins (R-20)
- Assistant Majority Whip: Greg Bell (R-22)
- Senate Rules Committee Chair: Margaret Dayton (R-15)

Minority (Democratic) Leadership

- Minority Leader: Patricia W. Jones (D-4)
- Minority Whip: Ross I. Romero (D-7)
- Assistant Minority Whip: Karen Mayne (D-5)
- Minority Caucus Manager: Luz Robles (D-1)

=== House of Representatives ===
- Speaker of the House: David Clark (R-74)

Majority (Republican) Leadership

- Majority Leader: Kevin Garn (R-16)
- Majority Whip: Brad Dee (R-11)
- Majority Assistant Whip: Rebecca Lockhart (R-64)
- House Rules Committee Chair: Ben Ferry (R-2)

Minority (Democratic) Leadership

- Minority Leader: David Litvack (D-26)
- Minority Whip: James Gowans (D-21)
- Minority Assistant Whip: Carol Spackman Moss (D-37)
- Minority Caucus Manager: Jennifer Seelig (D-23)

== Composure ==
=== Senate Makeup ===
Affiliation	Members
Republican Party	21
Democratic Party	8
Total	29
Government Majority	13

=== Members ===
Name	Party	District	Counties
Bell, Gregory S.	Republican	22	Davis
Bramble, Curtis S.	Republican	16	Utah
Buttars, D. Chris	Republican	10	Salt Lake
Christensen, Allen M.	Republican	19	Morgan, Summit, Weber
Davis, Gene	Democrat	3	Salt Lake
Dayton, Margaret	Republican	15	Utah
Goodfellow, Brent H.	Democrat	12	Salt Lake, Tooele
Greiner, Jon J.	Republican	18	Davis, Weber
Hillyard, Lyle W.	Republican	25	Cache, Rich
Hinkins, David	Republican	27	Carbon, Emery, Grand, San Juan, Utah
Jenkins, Scott K.	Republican	20	Weber
Jones, Patricia W.	Democrat	4	Salt Lake
Killpack, Sheldon L.	Republican	21	Davis
Knudson, Peter C.	Republican	17	Box Elder, Cache, Tooele
Liljenquist, Dan	Republican	23	Davis
Madsen, Mark B.	Republican	13	Tooele, Utah
Mayne, Ed	Democrat	5	Salt Lake
McCoy, Scott D.	Democrat	2	Salt Lake
Morgan, Karen	Democrat	8	Salt Lake
Niederhauser, Wayne L.	Republican	9	Salt Lake
Okerlund, Ralph	Republican	24	Juab, Piute, Sanpete, Sevier, Tooele, Wayne
Robles, Luz	Democrat	1	Salt Lake
Romero, Ross I.	Democrat	7	Salt Lake
Stephenson, Howard A.	Republican	11	Salt Lake, Utah
Stowell, Dennis E.	Republican	28	Beaver, Garfield, Iron, Kane, Millard, Washington
Valentine, John L.	Republican	14	Utah
VanTassell, Kevin T.	Republican	26	Daggett, Duchesne, Summit, Uintah, Wasatch
Waddoups, Michael G.	Republican	6	Salt Lake
Urquhart, Steve	Republican	29	Washington

=== House of Representatives Makeup ===
Affiliation	Members
Republican Party	53
Democratic Party	22
Total	75
Government Majority	31

=== Members ===
Name	Party	District	Residence	Freshman	Notes
Aagard, Douglas C.	Republican	15	Kaysville		
Allen, Sheryl L.	Republican	19	Bountiful		
Barrus, Roger E.	Republican	18	Centerville		
Beck, Trisha S.	Democrat	48	Sandy	X	
Chavez-Houck, Rebecca	Democrat	24	Salt Lake City		
Bigelow, Ron C.	Republican	32	West Valley City		
Bird, Jim	Republican	42	West Jordan		
Biskupski, Jackie	Democrat	30	Salt Lake City		
Black, Laura	Democrat	45	Sandy		
Brown, Melvin R.	Republican	53	Coalville		
Clark, David	Republican	74	Santa Clara		
Clark, Stephen D.	Republican	63	Provo		
Cosgrove, Tim M.	Democrat	44	Murray		
Daw, Bradley M.	Republican	60	Orem		
Dee, Brad L.	Republican	11	Ogden		
Dougall, John	Republican	27	American Fork		
Draxler, Jack R.	Republican	3	North Logan		
Duckworth, Susan	Democratic	22	Magna	X	
Dunnigan, James A.	Republican	39	Taylorsville		
Edwards, Rebecca	Republican	20	Bountiful	X	
Ferry, Ben C.	Republican	2	Corinne		
Fisher, Janice M.	Democrat	29	West Valley City		
Fisher, Julie	Republican	17	Fruit Heights		
Fowlke, Lorie D.	Republican	59	Orem		
Frank, Craig A.	Republican	57	Pleasant Grove		
Froerer, Gage	Republican	8	Huntsville		
Garn, Kevin S.	Republican	16	Layton		
Gibson, Francis D.	Republican	65	Springville	X	
Gibson, Kerry W.	Republican	6	Ogden		
Gowans, James R.	Democrat	21	Tooele		
Greenwood, Richard A.	Republican	12	Roy		
Grover, Keith	Republican	61	Provo		
Hansen, Neil A.	Democrat	9	Ogden		
Harper, Wayne A.	Republican	43	Ogden		
Hemingway, Lynn	Democrat	40	Salt Lake City		
Hendrickson, Neal B.	Democrat	33	West Valley City		
Herrod, Christopher N.	Republican	62	Provo		
Holdaway, Kory M.	Republican	34	Taylorsville		
Hughes, Gregory H.	Republican	51	Draper		
Hunsaker, Fred R.	Republican	4	Logan		
Hutchings, Eric K.	Republican	38	Kearns		
Ipson, Don L.	Republican	75	St. George	X	
Johnson, Christine	Democrat	25	Salt Lake City		
Kiser, Todd E.	Republican	41	Sandy		
Last, Bradley G.	Republican	71	St. George		
Litvack, David	Democrat	26	Salt Lake City		
Lockhart, Rebecca D.	Republican	64	Provo		
Mascaro, Steven R.	Republican	47	West Jordan		
Mathis, John G.	Republican	55	Vernal		
King, Brian S.	Democrat	28	Salt Lake City		
McIff, Kay L.	Republican	70	Richfield	X	
Menlove, Ronda Rudd	Republican	1	Garland		
Morley, Michael T.	Republican	66	Spanish Fork		
Moss, Carol Spackman	Democrat	37	Salt Lake City		
Newbold, Merlynn T.	Republican	50	South Jordan		
Noel, Michael E.	Republican	73	Kanab		
Oda, Curtis	Republican	14	Clearfield		
Painter, Patrick	Republican	67	Nephi		
Powell, Kraig	Republican	54	Heber City	X	
Poulson, Marie H.	Democrat	46	Salt Lake City	X	
Ray, Paul	Republican	13	Clearfield		
Riesen, Phil	Democrat	36	Salt Lake City		
Sandstrom, Stephen E.	Republican	58	Orem		
Seegmiller, F. Jay	Democrat	49	Salt Lake City	X	
Seelig, Jennifer M.	Democrat	23	Salt Lake City		
Sumsion, Kenneth W.	Republican	56	American Fork		
Vickers, Evan J.	Republican	72	Cedar City	X	
Wallis, Brent	Republican	10	Ogden	X	
Watkins, Christine F.	Democrat	69	Price	X	
Webb, R. Curt	Republican	5	Logan		
Wheatley, Mark A.	Democrat	35	Murray		
Wilcox, Ryan	Republican	7	Ogden	X	
Wiley, Larry B.	Democrat	31	West Valley City		
Wimmer, Carl	Republican	52	Herriman	X	
Winn, Bradley A.	Republican	68	Ephraim	X	

== Employees/Staff ==
- Legislative Research Library and Information Center
- Office of Legislative Printing
- Office of the Legislative Auditor General
- Office of the Legislative Fiscal Analyst
- Office of Legislative Research and General Counsel

== See also ==
- Government of Utah
- List of Utah State Legislatures

Preceded by 57th Utah Legislature	58th Utah Legislature; 2009 - 2010	Succeeded by 59th Utah Legislature
