= 59th Utah State Legislature =

- Utah State Legislature

Type
- Type: Upper house
- Term limits: None

History
- New session started: January 24, 2011

Leadership
- President of the Senate: Michael G. Waddoups (R) since November 7, 2008
- Majority Leader: Scott K. Jenkins (R) since January 20, 2010
- Minority Leader: Ross I. Romero (D) since November 5, 2010

Structure
- Seats: 29
- Political groups: Republican Party (22); Democratic Party (7)
- Length of term: 2 years
- Authority: Article VI, Utah Constitution
- Salary: $117/day + per diem

Elections
- Last election: November 2, 2010 (15 seats)
- Next election: November 6, 2012 (14 seats)
- Redistricting: Legislative Control

Meeting place
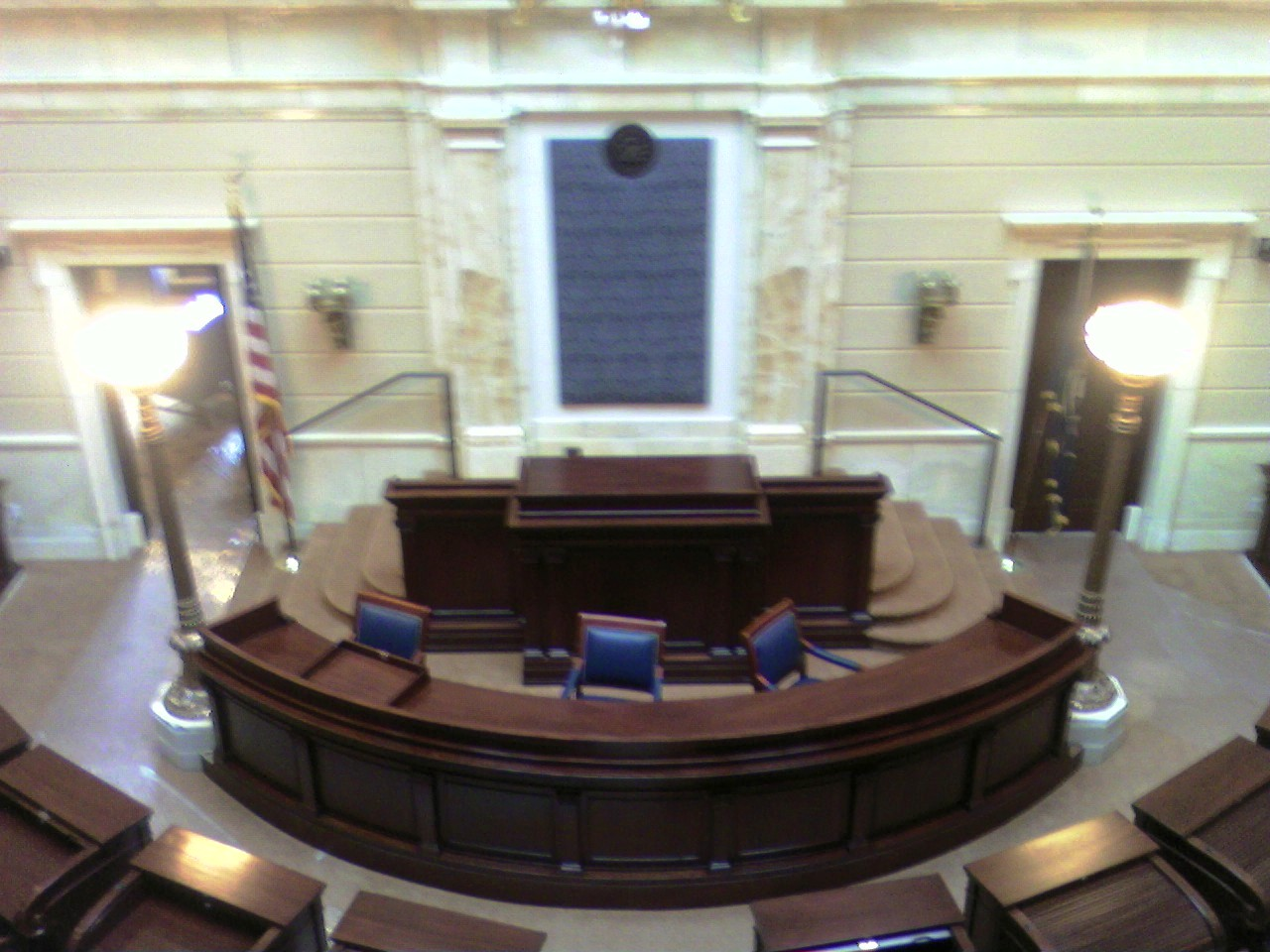

Website
- Utah State Senate

The 59th Utah State Legislature was elected Tuesday, November 2, 2010, and convened on January 24, 2011.

== Dates of sessions ==
- 2009 General Session: January 24, 2011 - March 10, 2011

== Leadership ==
Affiliation	Party (Shading indicates majority caucus)		Total	
Affiliation	Republican	Democratic	Total	Vacant
End of the 58th legislature	21	8	29	0
Beginning of the 59th Legislature	22	7	29	0
Latest voting share	75.8%	24.2%		

=== Leadership, 2011-2012 session ===
Position	Name	Party	District
President of the Senate	Michael G. Waddoups	Republican	6
Majority Leader	Scott K. Jenkins	Republican	20
Majority Whip	Wayne L. Niederhauser	Republican	9
Assistant Majority Whip	Peter C. Knudson	Republican	17
Minority Leader	Ross I. Romero	Democratic	7
Minority Whip	Karen Morgan	Democratic	8
Assistant Minority Whip	Patricia W. Jones	Democratic	4

=== House of Representatives ===
Position	Name	Party	District
Speaker of the House	Becky Lockhart	Republican	74
Majority Leader	Brad Dee	Republican	16
Majority Whip	Gregory Hughes	Republican	11
Minority Leader	David Litvack	Democratic	26
Minority Whip	Jennifer Seelig	Democratic	21

== Composition ==
=== Senate Makeup ===
Affiliation	Members
Republican Party	21
Democratic Party	8
Total	29
Government Majority	13

=== Members ===
District	Name	Party	Counties Represent
1	Luz Robles	Dem	Salt Lake
2	Ben McAdams	Dem	Salt Lake
3	Gene Davis	Dem	Salt Lake
4	Patricia W. Jones	Dem	Salt Lake
5	Karen Mayne	Dem	Salt Lake
6	Michael G. Waddoups	Rep	Salt Lake
7	Ross I. Romero	Dem	Salt Lake
8	Karen Morgan	Dem	Salt Lake
9	Wayne L. Niederhauser	Rep	Salt Lake
10	Chris Buttars	Rep	Salt Lake
11	Howard A. Stephenson	Rep	Salt Lake, Utah
12	Daniel W. Thatcher	Rep	Salt Lake, Tooele
13	Mark B. Madsen	Rep	Tooele, Utah
14	John L. Valentine	Rep	Utah
15	Margaret Dayton	Rep	Utah
16	Curt Bramble	Rep	Utah
17	Peter C. Knudson	Rep	Box Elder, Cache, Tooele
18	Jon J. Greiner	Rep	Davis, Weber
19	Allen M. Christensen	Rep	Morgan, Summit, Weber
20	Scott K. Jenkins	Rep	Weber
21	Jerry W. Stevenson	Rep	Davis
22	Stuart Adams	Rep	Davis
23	Daniel Liljenquist	Rep	Davis
24	Ralph Okerlund	Rep	Juab, Piute, Sanpete, Sevier, Tooele, Wayne
25	Lyle W. Hillyard	Rep	Cache, Rich
26	Kevin T. VanTassell	Rep	Daggett, Duchesne, Summit, Uintah, Wasatch
27	David P. Hinkins	Rep	Carbon, Emery, Grand, San Juan, Utah
28	Dennis E. Stowell	Rep	Beaver, Garfield, Iron, Kane, Millard, Washington
29	Stephen H. Urquhart	Rep	Washington

=== Members ===
District	Name	Party	Residence	Freshman
1	Ronda Menlove	Republican	Garland	
2	Lee Perry	Republican	Perry	X
3	Jack Draxler	Republican	North Logan	
4	David Butterfield	Republican	Logan	X
5	R. Curt Webb	Republican	Logan	
6	Brad Galvez	Republican	West Haven	X
7	Ryan Wilcox	Republican	North Ogden	
8	Gage Froerer	Republican	Huntsville	
9	Jeremy Peterson	Republican	Ogden	X
10	Dixon Pitcher	Republican	Ogden	X
11	Brad Dee	Republican	Ogden	
12	Richard Greenwood	Republican	Roy	
13	Paul Ray	Republican	Clearfield	
14	Curtis Oda	Republican	Clearfield	
15	Brad Wilson	Republican	Kaysville	X
16	Stephen Handy	Republican	Layton	X
17	Julie Fisher	Republican	Fruit Heights	
18	Roger Barrus	Republican	Centerville	
19	Jim Nielson	Republican	Bountiful	X
20	Rebecca Edwards	Republican	Bountiful	
21	Douglas Sagers	Republican	Tooele	
22	Susan Duckworth	Democratic	Magna	
23	Jennifer Seelig	Democratic	Salt Lake City	
24	Rebecca Chavez-Houck	Democratic	Salt Lake City	
25	Joel Briscoe	Democratic	Salt Lake City	X
26	David Litvack	Democratic	Salt Lake City	
27	John Dougall	Republican	American Fork	
28	Brian King	Democratic	Salt Lake City	
29	Janice Fisher	Democratic	West Valley City	
30	Jackie Biskupski	Democratic	Salt Lake City	
31	Larry Wiley	Democratic	West Valley City	
32	Fred Cox	Republican	West Valley City	X
33	Neal Henrickson	Democratic	West Valley City	
34	Johnny Anderson	Republican	Taylorsville	X
35	Mark A. Wheatley	Democratic	Murray	
36	Patrice M. Arent	Democratic	Salt Lake City	X
37	Carol Spackman Moss	Democratic	Salt Lake City	
38	Eric Hutchings	Republican	Kearns	
39	James Dunnigan	Republican	Taylorsville	
40	Lynn Hemingway	Democratic	Salt Lake City	
41	Todd Kiser	Republican	Sandy	
42	Jim Bird	Republican	West Jordan	
43	Wayne Harper	Republican	West Jordan	
44	Tim Cosgrove	Democratic	Murray	
45	Steve Eliason	Republican	Sandy	X
46	Marie Poulson	Democratic	Salt Lake City	
47	Ken Ivory	Republican	West Jordan	X
48	LaVar Christensen	Republican	Draper	X
49	Derek Brown	Republican	Salt Lake City	X
50	Merlynn Newbold	Republican	South Jordan	
51	Gregory Hughes	Republican	Draper	
52	Carl Wimmer	Republican	Herriman	
53	Melvin Brown	Republican	Coalville	
54	Kraig Powell	Republican	Heber	
55	John Mathis	Republican	Vernal	
56	Kenneth Sumsion	Republican	American Fork	
57	Holly Richardson	Republican	Pleasant Grove	X
58	Stephen Sandstrom	Republican	Orem	
59	Val Peterson	Republican	Orem	
60	Bradley Daw	Republican	Orem	
61	Keith Grover	Republican	Provo	
62	Christopher Herrod	Republican	Provo	
63	Dean Sanpei	Republican	Provo	X
64	Rebecca D. Lockhart	Republican	Provo	
65	Francis Gibson	Republican	Springville	
66	Michael Morley	Republican	Spanish Fork	
67	Patrick Painter	Republican	Nephi	
68	Bill Wright	Republican	Ephraim	
69	Christine Watkins	Democratic	Price	
70	Kay McIff	Republican	Richfield	
71	Bradley Last	Republican	St. George	
72	Evan Vickers	Republican	Cedar City	
73	Michael Noel	Republican	Kanab	
74	David Clark	Republican	Santa Clara	
75	Don Ipson	Republican	St. George	

== Employees/Staff ==
- Legislative Research Library and Information Center
- Office of Legislative Printing
- Office of the Legislative Auditor General
- Office of the Legislative Fiscal Analyst
- Office of Legislative Research and General Counsel

== See also ==
- Government of Utah
- List of Utah State Legislatures
- Utah Transfer of Public Lands Act

Preceded by 58th Utah State Legislature	59th Utah State Legislature; 2009 - 2010	Succeeded by 60th Utah State Legislature
