= 57th Utah State Legislature =

←	56th Utah State Legislature	58th Utah State Legislature	→
- The Great Seal of Utah

Overview
- Legislative body: Utah State Legislature
- Jurisdiction: Utah, United States
- Meeting place: Utah State Capitol
- Term: January 15, 2007 - January 26, 2009
- Website: http://www.le.state.ut.us/

Senate
- Members: 29
- President: John L. Valentine
- Majority Leader: Curt Bramble
- Minority Leader: Mike Dmitrich
- Party control: Republican

House of Representatives
- Members: 75
- Speaker: Greg Curtis
- Majority Leader: Dave Clark
- Minority Leader: Ralph Becker
- Party control: Republican

The 57th Utah State Legislature was elected Tuesday, November 7, 2006 and convened on Monday, January 15, 2007.

== Dates of sessions ==
- 2007 General Session: January 15, 2007 - February 28, 2007
- 2007 First Special Session: August 22, 2007
- 2008 General Session: January 21, 2008 - March 5, 2008

== Officers ==
=== Utah State Senate ===
Office	Office-holder
President of the Senate	John L. Valentine
Secretary of the Senate	Annette B. Moore
Minute Clerk	Leslie O. McLean
Docket Clerk	Lynette Erickson

=== Utah State House of Representatives ===
Office	Office-holder
Speaker of the House	Greg Curtis
Chief Clerk	Sandy D. Tenney
Reading Clerk	Ann Tilson
Journal Clerk	Janice A. Gadd

== Leadership ==
=== Utah Senate ===
- President of the Senate: John L. Valentine (R-14)

Majority (Republican) Leadership

- Majority Leader: Curt Bramble (R-16)
- Majority Whip: Dan R. Eastman (R-23)
- Assistant Majority Whip: Sheldon Killpack (R-21)
- Senate Rules Committee Chair: John W. Hickman (R-29)

Minority (Democratic) Leadership

- Minority Leader: Mike Dmitrich (D-27)
- Minority Whip: Gene Davis (D-3)
- Assistant Minority Whip: Ed Mayne (D-5)
- Minority Caucus Manager: Pat Jones (D-4)

=== Utah House of Representatives ===
- Speaker of the House: Greg Curtis (R-49)

Majority (Republican) Leadership

- Majority Leader: Dave Clark (R-74)
- Majority Whip: Gordon E. Snow (R-54)
- Assistant Majority Whip: Brad Dee (R-11)
- House Rules Committee Chair: Stephen H. Urquhart (R-75)

Minority (Democratic) Leadership

- Minority Leader: Ralph Becker (D-24)
- Minority Whip: Brad King (D-69)
- Assistant Minority Whip: Carol Spackman Moss (D-37)
- Minority Caucus Manager: David Litvack (D-26)

== Utah Senate ==
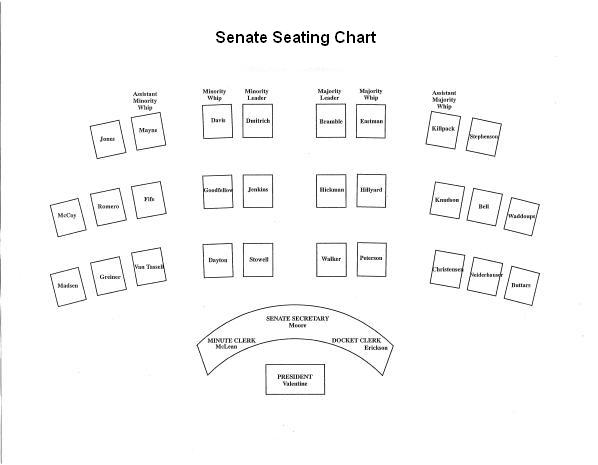
The Utah State Senate seating chart.

=== Make-up ===
Affiliation	Members
Republican Party	21
Democratic Party	8
Total	29
Government Majority	13

=== Members ===
Name	Party	District	Counties
Bell, Gregory S.	Republican	22	Davis
Bramble, Curtis S.	Republican	16	Utah
Buttars, D. Chris	Republican	10	Salt Lake
Christensen, Allen M.	Republican	19	Morgan, Summit, Weber
Davis, Gene	Democrat	3	Salt Lake
Dayton, Margaret	Republican	15	Utah
Dmitrich, Mike	Democrat	27	Carbon, Emery, Grand, San Juan, Utah
Eastman, Dan R.	Republican	23	Davis
Fife, Fred J.	Democrat	1	Salt Lake
Goodfellow, Brent H.	Democrat	12	Salt Lake, Tooele
Greiner, Jon J.	Republican	18	Davis, Weber
Hickman, John W.	Republican	29	Washington
Hillyard, Lyle W.	Republican	25	Cache, Rich
Jenkins, Scott K.	Republican	20	Weber
Jones, Patricia W.	Democrat	4	Salt Lake
Killpack, Sheldon L.	Republican	21	Davis
Knudson, Peter C.	Republican	17	Box Elder, Cache, Tooele
Madsen, Mark B.	Republican	13	Tooele, Utah
Mayne, Ed	Democrat	5	Salt Lake
McCoy, Scott D.	Democrat	2	Salt Lake
Niederhauser, Wayne L.	Republican	9	Salt Lake
Peterson, Darin	Republican	24	Juab, Piute, Sanpete, Sevier, Tooele, Wayne
Romero, Ross I.	Democrat	7	Salt Lake
Stephenson, Howard A.	Republican	11	Salt Lake, Utah
Stowell, Dennis E.	Republican	28	Beaver, Garfield, Iron, Kane, Millard, Washington
Valentine, John L.	Republican	14	Utah
VanTassell, Kevin T.	Republican	26	Daggett, Duchesne, Summit, Uintah, Wasatch
Waddoups, Michael G.	Republican	6	Salt Lake
Walker, Carlene M.	Republican	8	Salt Lake

== Utah House of Representatives ==
=== Make-up ===
Affiliation	Members
Republican Party	55
Democratic Party	20
Total	75
Government Majority	37

=== Members ===
Name	Party	District	Residence	Freshman	Notes
Aagard, Douglas C.	Republican	15	Kaysville		
Allen, Sheryl L.	Republican	19	Bountiful		
Andersen, Sylvia	Republican	48	Sandy	X	
Barrus, Roger E.	Republican	18	Centerville		
Becker, Ralph	Democrat	24	Salt Lake City		Elected Mayor of Salt Lake City on November 6, 2007.; Rebecca Chavez-Houck was appointed to replace Ralph Becker as Representative for District 24.
Bigelow, Ron C.	Republican	32	West Valley City		
Bird, Jim	Republican	42	West Jordan	X	
Biskupski, Jackie	Democrat	30	Salt Lake City		
Bowman, DeMar Bud	Republican	72	Cedar City		
Brown, Melvin R.	Republican	53	Coalville	X	
Buxton, D. Gregg	Republican	12	Roy		Appointed Director of the Division of Facilities Construction and Management (DFCM) in April 2007.; Richard A. Greenwood was appointed to replace D. Gregg Buxton as Representative for District 12.
Chavez-Houck, Rebecca	Democratic	24	Salt Lake City	X	Appointed to replace Ralph Becker who was elected Mayor of Salt Lake City.; Sworn into Office on January 16, 2008.
Clark, David	Republican	74	Santa Clara		
Clark, Stephen D.	Republican	63	Provo		
Cosgrove, Tim M.	Democrat	44	Murray		
Curtis, Greg J.	Republican	49	Salt Lake City		
Daw, Bradley M.	Republican	60	Orem		
Dee, Brad L.	Republican	11	Ogden, Utah		
Donnelson, Glenn A.	Republican	7	North Ogden		
Dougall, John	Republican	27	American Fork		
Draxler, Jack R.	Republican	3	North Logan	X	
Duckworth, Carl S.	Democratic	22	Magna		
Dunnigan, James A.	Republican	39	Taylorsville		
Ferry, Ben C.	Republican	2	Corinne		
Fisher, Janice M.	Democrat	29	West Valley City		
Fisher, Julie	Republican	17	Fruit Heights		
Fowlke, Lorie D.	Republican	59	Orem		
Frank, Craig A.	Republican	57	Pleasant Grove		
Froerer, Gage	Republican	8	Huntsville	X	
Garn, Kevin S.	Republican	16	Layton	X	
Gibson, Kerry W.	Republican	6	Ogden		
Gowans, James R.	Democrat	21	Tooele		
Greenwood, Richard A.	Republican	12	Roy		Appointed to replace D. Gregg Buxton who was appointed Director of DFCM in April 2007.; Sworn in on January 16, 2008
Grover, Keith	Republican	61	Provo	X	
Hansen, Neil A.	Democrat	9	Ogden		
Harper, Wayne A.	Republican	43	Ogden		
Hemingway, Lynn	Democrat	40	Salt Lake City	X	
Hendrickson, Neal B.	Democrat	33	West Valley City		
Herrod, Christopher N.	Republican	62	Provo	X	
Holdaway, Kory M.	Republican	34	Taylorsville		
Hughes, Gregory H.	Republican	51	Draper		
Hunsaker, Fred R.	Republican	4	Logan		
Hutchings, Eric K.	Republican	38	Kearns		
Johnson, Christine	Democrat	25	Salt Lake City	X	
King, Brad	Democrat	69	Price		
Kiser, Todd E.	Republican	41	Sandy		
Last, Bradley G.	Republican	71	St. George		
Litvack, David	Democrat	26	Salt Lake City		
Lockhart, Rebecca D.	Republican	64	Provo		
Mascaro, Steven R.	Republican	47	West Jordan		
Mathis, John G.	Republican	55	Vernal		
McGee, Rosalind J.	Democrat	28	Salt Lake City		
McIff, Kay L.	Republican	70	Richfield	X	
Menlove, Ronda Rudd	Republican	1	Garland		
Morgan, Karen W.	Democrat	46	Salt Lake City		
Morley, Michael T.	Republican	66	Spanish Fork		
Moss, Carol Spackman	Democrat	37	Salt Lake City		
Neuenschwander, Paul A.	Republican	20	Bountiful	X	
Newbold, Merlynn T.	Republican	50	South Jordan		
Noel, Michael E.	Republican	73	Kanab		
Oda, Curtis	Republican	14	Clearfield		
Painter, Patrick	Republican	67	Nephi		
Ray, Paul	Republican	13	Clearfield		
Riesen, Phil	Democrat	36	Salt Lake City	X	
Sandstrom, Stephen E.	Republican	58	Orem	X	
Seelig, Jennifer M.	Democrat	23	Salt Lake City		
Shurtliff, LaWanna Lou	Democrat	10	Ogden		
Snow, Gordon E.	Republican	54	Roosevelt		
Sumsion, Kenneth W.	Republican	56	American Fork	X	
Tilton, Aaron	Republican	65	Springville		
Urquhart, Stephen H.	Republican	75	St. George		
Walker, Mark W.	Republican	45	Sandy		
Webb, R. Curt	Republican	5	Logan		Appointed to replace Scott L. Wyatt who was appointed President of Snow College.; Sworn in on January 16, 2008.
Wheatley, Mark A.	Democrat	35	Murray		
Wheeler, Richard W.	Republican	68	Ephraim		Called to the Fifth Quorum of the Seventy of the Church of Jesus Christ of Latter-day Saints.; Bradley A. Winn was appointed to replace Richard W. Wheeler as Representative for District 68.
Wiley, Larry B.	Democrat	31	West Valley City		
Wimmer, Carl	Republican	52	Herriman	X	
Winn, Bradley A.	Republican	68	Ephraim	X	Appointed to replace Richard A. Wheeler who was called to the 5th Quorum of the Seventy of the Church of Jesus Christ of Latter-day Saints.; Sworn in on January 16, 2008.
Wyatt, Scott L.	Republican	5	Logan		Appointed President of Snow College in July 2007.; R. Curt Webb was appointed to replace Scott L. Wyatt as Representative for District 5.

== Employees/Staff ==
- Legislative Research Library and Information Center
- Office of Legislative Printing
- Office of the Legislative Auditor General
- Office of the Legislative Fiscal Analyst
- Office of Legislative Research and General Counsel

== See also ==
- Government of Utah
- List of Utah State Legislatures

Preceded by 56th Utah Legislature	57th Utah Legislature; 2007 - 2008	Succeeded by 58th Utah Legislature
