= 56th Utah State Legislature =

The 56th Utah State Legislature was elected Tuesday, November 2, 2004 and convened on Monday, January 17, 2005.

== Dates of sessions ==
- 2005 General Session: January 17, 2005 - March 2, 2005
- 2005 First Special Session: April 19–20, 2005
- 2005 Second Special Session: November 9, 2005
- 2006 General Session: January 16, 2006 - March 1, 2006
- 2006 Third Special Session: May 24, 2006
- 2006 Fourth Special Session: September 19, 2006

== Leadership ==
=== Utah Senate ===
- President of the Senate: John L. Valentine (R-14)

Majority (Republican) Leadership

- Majority Leader: Peter C. Knudson (R-17)
- Majority Whip: Dan R. Eastman (R-23)
- Assistant Majority Whip: Beverly Evans (R-26)

Minority (Democratic) Leadership

- Minority Leader: Mike Dmitrich (D-27)
- Minority Whip: Gene Davis (D-3)
- Assistant Minority Whip: Karen Hale (D-7)
- Minority Caucus Manager: Ed Mayne (D-5)

=== Utah House of Representatives ===
- Speaker of the House: Greg Curtis (R-49)

Majority (Republican) Leadership

- Majority Leader: Jeff Alexander (R-62)
- Majority Whip: Stephen H. Urquhart (R-75)
- Assistant Majority Whip: Ben C. Ferry (R-2)

Minority (Democratic) Leadership

- Minority Leader: Ralph Becker (D-24)
- Minority Whip: Brad King (D-69)
- Assistant Minority Whip: Patricia Jones (D-40)
- Minority Caucus Manager: Rosalind McGee (D-28)

== Utah Senate ==
=== Make-up ===
Affiliation	Members
Republican Party	21
Democratic Party	10
Total	31
Government Majority	11

=== Members ===
Name	Party	District	Counties
Allen, Ron	Democrat	12	Salt Lake, Tooele
Arent, Patrice M.	Democrat	4	Salt Lake
Bell, Gregory S.	Republican	22	Davis
Bramble, Curtis S.	Republican	16	Utah
Buttars, D. Chris	Republican	10	Salt Lake
Christensen, Allen M.	Republican	19	Morgan, Summit, Weber
Davis, Gene	Democrat	3	Salt Lake
Dmitrich, Mike	Democrat	27	Carbon, Emery, Grand, San Juan, Utah
Eastman, Dan R.	Republican	23	Davis
Evans, Beverly Ann	Republican	26	Daggett, Duchesne, Summit, Uintah, Wasatch
Fife, Fred J.	Democrat	1	Salt Lake
Goodfellow, Brent H.	Democrat	12	Salt Lake, Tooele
Hale, Karen	Democrat	7	Salt Lake
Hatch, Thomas V.	Republican	28	Beaver, Garfield, Iron, Kane, Millard, Washington
Hellewell, Parley G.	Republican	15	Utah
Hickman, John W.	Republican	29	Washington
Hillyard, Lyle W.	Republican	25	Cache, Rich
Jenkins, Scott K.	Republican	20	Weber
Julander, Paula F.	Democrat	2	Salt Lake
Killpack, Sheldon L.	Republican	21	Davis
Knudson, Peter C.	Republican	17	Box Elder, Cache, Tooele
Madsen, Mark B.	Republican	13	Tooele, Utah
Mansell, L. Alma	Republican	9	Salt Lake
Mayne, Ed	Democrat	5	Salt Lake
McCoy, Scott D.	Democrat	2	Salt Lake
Peterson, Darin	Republican	24	Juab, Piute, Sanpete, Sevier, Tooele, Wayne
Stephenson, Howard A.	Republican	11	Salt Lake, Utah
Thomas, David L.	Republican	18	Davis, Weber
Valentine, John L.	Republican	14	Utah
Waddoups, Michael G.	Republican	6	Salt Lake
Walker, Carlene M.	Republican	8	Salt Lake

== Utah House of Representatives ==
=== Make-up ===
Affiliation	Members
Republican Party	56
Democratic Party	19
Total	75
Government Majority	35

=== Members ===
Name	Party	District
Douglas C. Aagard	Republican	15
Adams, J. Stuart	Republican	16
Alexander, Jeff	Republican	62
Allen, Sheryl L.	Republican	19
Barrus, Roger E.	Republican	18
Becker, Ralph	Democrat	24
Bigelow, Ron	Republican	32
Biskupski, Jackie	Democrat	30
Bourdeaux, Duane E.	Democrat	23
Bowman, DeMar Bud	Republican	72
Buttars, Craig W.	Republican	3
Buxton, D. Gregg	Republican	12
Christensen, LaVar	Republican	48
Clark, David	Republican	74
Clark, Stephen D.	Republican	63
Cosgrove, Tim M.	Democrat	44
Cox, David N.	Republican	56
Curtis, Greg J.	Republican	49
Daw, Bradley M.	Republican	60
Dayton, Margaret	Republican	61
Dee, Brad L.	Republican	11
Donnelson, Glenn A.	Republican	7
Dougall, John	Republican	27
Duckworth, Carl W.	Democrat	22
Dunnigan, James A.	Republican	39
Ferrin, James A.	Republican	58
Ferry, Ben C.	Republican	2
Fisher, Janice M.	Democrat	29
Fisher, Julie	Republican	17
Fowlke, Lorie D.	Republican	59
Frank, Craig A.	Republican	57
Gibson, Kerry W.	Republican	6
Goodfellow, Brent H.	Democrat	29
Gowans, James R.	Democrat	21
Hansen, Neil A.	Democrat	9
Hardy, Ann W.	Republican	20
Harper, Wayne A.	Republican	43
Hendrickson, Neal B.	Democrat	33
Hogue, David L.	Republican	52
Holdaway, Kory M.	Republican	34
Hughes, Gregory H.	Republican	51
Hunsaker, Fred R.	Republican	4
Hutchings, Eric K.	Republican	38
Johnson, Bradley T.	Republican	70
Jones, Patricia W.	Democrat	40
King, Brad	Democrat	69
Kiser, Todd E.	Republican	41
Last, Bradley G.	Republican	71
Lawrence, M. Susan	Republican	36
Litvack, David	Democrat	26
Lockhart, Rebecca D.	Republican	64
Mascaro, Steven R.	Republican	47
Mathis, John G.	Republican	55
McCartney, Ty	Democrat	31
McGee, Rosalind J.	Democrat	28
Menlove, Ronda Rudd	Republican	1
Morgan, Karen W.	Democrat	46
Morley, Michael T.	Republican	66
Moss, Carol Spackman	Democrat	37
Murray, Joseph G.	Republican	8
Newbold, Merlynn T.	Republican	50
Noel, Michael E.	Republican	73
Oda, Curtis	Republican	14
Painter, Patrick	Republican	67
Ray, Paul	Republican	13
Romero, Ross I.	Democrat	25
Shurtliff, LaWanna Lou	Democrat	10
Snow, Gordon E.	Republican	54
Tilton, Aaron	Republican	65
Ure, David	Republican	53
Stephen H. Urquhart	Republican	75
Mark W. Walker	Republican	45
Wallace, Peggy	Republican	42
Mark A. Wheatley	Democrat	35
Wheeler, Richard W.	Republican	68
Wiley, Larry B.	Democrat	31
Wyatt, Scott L.	Republican	5

== Employees/Staff ==
- Legislative Research Library and Information Center
- Office of Legislative Printing
- Office of the Legislative Auditor General
- Office of the Legislative Fiscal Analyst
- Office of Legislative Research and General Counsel

== See also ==
- Utah State Legislature
- 2008 Election Results
- Office of the Governor
- List of Utah State Legislatures

Preceded by 55th Utah Legislature	56th Utah Legislature; 2005 - 2006	Succeeded by 57th Utah Legislature
