= Waddoups =

Waddoups is a surname. Notable people with the surname include:

- Clark Waddoups (born 1946), American judge
- Michael G. Waddoups (born 1948), American politician and property manager
