= Mark Wheatley =

Mark Wheatley may refer to:

- Mark Wheatley (politician)
- Mark Wheatley (comics)
