= Alvin B. Jackson =

American politician

Alvin Jackson
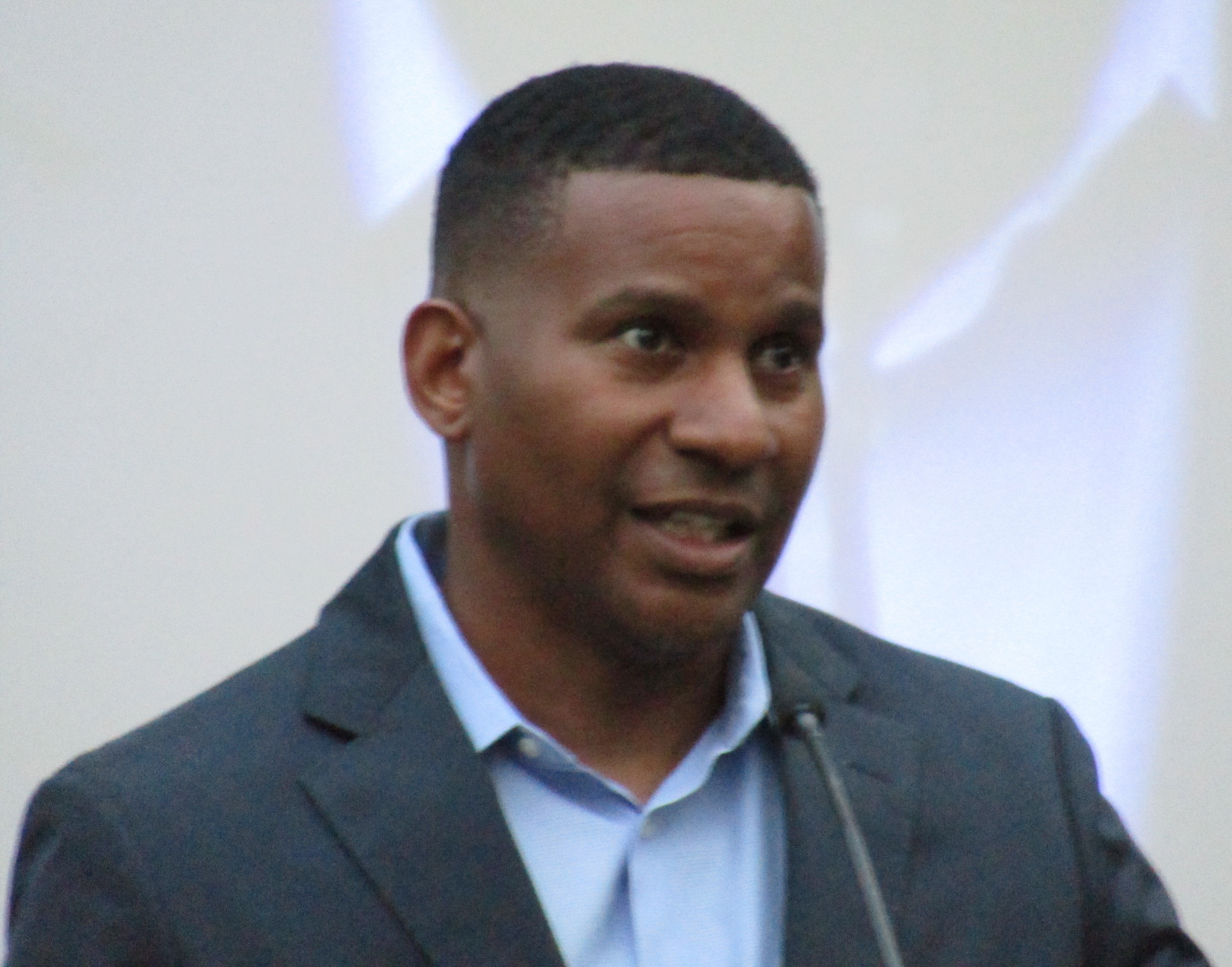

Member of the Utah Senate from the 14th district
- In office 2014 – July 1, 2016
- Preceded by: John Valentine
- Succeeded by: Dan Hemmert

Personal details
- Born: Buford, South Carolina
- Party: Republican
- Education: Embry-Riddle Aeronautical University (BS); Johns Hopkins University (MBA)
- Occupation: Consultant

Alvin B. Jackson is a former Republican Senator for Utah State's 14th district. He was appointed by Governor Gary Herbert to fill a vacant seat caused by the resignation of John Valentine, who resigned to head the Utah Tax Commission. He resigned in July 2016 to take a job out of state, and was replaced by another appointee, Daniel Hemmert.

== Personal life ==
Jackson was born in Buford, South Carolina and raised in Silver Spring, Maryland.

He has a BS degree in aviation business administration from Embry–Riddle Aeronautical University. While there he played both basketball and baseball.

He also has an MBA from Johns Hopkins University. While living in Washington, DC shortly after completing his MBA, Jackson joined the Church of Jesus Christ of Latter-day Saints. A year later he married his wife, Juleen, who was raised in Utah. For a time Jackson served as bishop of the Kensington Ward located in Kensington, Maryland.

Alvin Jackson has spent much of his life working as a consultant. He currently serves principal of his own consulting firm, the Jackson Group, which provides strategic council in the areas of leadership and business development. Prior to moving to Utah, Jackson worked in Washington, DC as a consultant providing council on matters involving national security and transportation. Jackson was also a vice president for a subsidiary to Boeing called Insitu. Alvin's son Frank Jackson is a former Duke basketball player who was selected in the second round of the 2017 NBA draft. Frank currently plays for the Ningbo Rockets of the Chinese Basketball Association.

Jackson has served as a member of the BYU Marriott School's National Advisory Council since 2006.

== Political career ==
Senator Jackson was appointed by Governor Herbert to fill the seat of John Valentine in 2014. Between 2014 and 2016, he served as the senator from Utah's 14th district. Jackson chose not to seek reelection in 2016.

During the 2016 legislative session, Jackson served on the following committees:

- Social Services Appropriations Subcommittee
- Senate Government Operations and Political Subdivisions Committee
- Senate Transportation, Public Utilities, Energy, and Technology Committee (chair)

== Legislation ==
=== 2016 sponsored bills ===
Bill number and Title	Status of BillPrimary
S.B. 45 Compulsory Education Revisions	Senate/Filed for bills not passed 3/10/2016
S.B. 46 State Education Governance Revisions	Senate/Filed for bills not passed 3/10/2016
S.B. 79 Child Welfare Revisions	Governor Signed 3/30/2016
S.B. 86 School Building Coordination	Governor Signed 3/28/2016
S.B. 90 Falsification of Information in a Protective Order Proceeding	Senate/Filed for bills not passed 3/10/2016
S.B. 214 Workplace Abusive Conduct Amendments	Senate/Filed for bills not passed 3/10/2016
S.C.R 5 Concurrent Resolution in Support of Law Enforcement Officers	Governor Signed 3/17/2016
S.J.R. 1 Proposal to Amend Utah Constitution -- State Board of Education Changes	Senate/Filed for bills not passed 3/10/2016
S.J.R. 2 Joint Resolution Calling for the Repeal of the 17th Amendment	Senate/To Lieutenant Governor 3/15/2016

=== Notable legislation ===
During the 2016 legislative session, Jackson sponsored a resolution calling for the repeal of the 17th amendment. The resolution passed both the House and Senate.
