= Jennifer Dailey-Provost =

American politician

Minority Leader of the Utah House of Representatives
- Assuming office January 1, 2027
- Succeeding: Angela Romero

Member of the Utah House of Representatives
- Incumbent
- Assumed office January 1, 2019
- Preceded by: Rebecca Chavez-Houck
- Constituency: 24th district (2019–2023); 22nd district (2023–present)

Personal details
- Party: Democratic
- Education: University of Utah (BS, PhD); Westminster College (MBA)
- Website: jenforutah.com

Jennifer Dailey-Provost is an American politician serving as a member of the Utah House of Representatives from the 22nd district. Elected in November 2018, she assumed office on January 1, 2019.

== Education ==
Dailey-Provost earned a Bachelor of Science degree in marketing from the David Eccles School of Business at the University of Utah, an MBA from Westminster College, and a PhD in Public Health from the University of Utah School of Medicine.

== Career ==
Dailey-Provost was executive director of Utah Academy of Family Physicians, where she lobbied for family medicine and primary care.

In the 2018 general election for the Utah House of Representatives, she defeated Republican candidate Scott Rosenbush, with 77% of the vote.

On November 16, 2026, the Utah House Democratic caucus selected Dailey-Provost to be House Minority Leader for the 2027 session.

== Political positions and significant legislation ==
In 2019, Rep. Dailey-Provost sponsored end-of-life legislation in the 2019 legislative session, but the bill did not receive a hearing. In 2022, she tried again, but the bill was defeated 2-9 in committee.

In 2021, Rep. Dailey-Provost sponsored a bill that would "allow women held in jails to be able to stay on their prescribed birth control, with the goal to prevent unwanted pregnancies". The bill passed the legislature and was signed by Governor Cox into law.
