= Gage Froerer =

American politician (born 1952)

Member of the Utah House of Representatives from the 8th district
- In office January 1, 2007 – January 2019
- Preceded by: Joe Murray
- Succeeded by: Steve Waldrip

Personal details
- Born: September 15, 1952 (age 74)
- Party: Republican
- Spouse: Gloria
- Education: Utah State University; University of Utah
- Website: votegage.com

Gage Froerer (born September 15, 1952) is an American realtor who served as a Republican member of the Utah House of Representatives for District 8 since from January 1, 2007, to January 2019. Froerer was a candidate for the Utah State Senate in 2004.

== Early life and career ==
Froerer earned a Bachelor of Science degree in finance from Utah State University and an MBA from the University of Utah. He works in real estate and lives in Huntsville, Utah with his wife Gloria and three children.

== Political career ==
2014 Froerer was unopposed in the Republican primary and won the general election with 3,967 votes (66.08%) against Democrat John Thompson's 2,036 votes (33.9%).

2012 Froerer was unopposed for the June 26, 2012 Republican primary and won the three-way November 6, 2012 general election with 7,650 votes (64.2%) against Democratic nominee Nick Velis and Libertarian candidate Jared Stratton.

2010 Froerer was unopposed for the June 22, 2010 Republican primary, and won the November 2, 2010 general election with 4,218 votes (61.8%) against Democratic nominee Alan Wheelwright.

2008 Froerer was challenged but chosen by the Republican convention for the November 4, 2008 general election, winning with 6,190 votes (57.1%) against Democratic nominee Trent Alvord, who had been Frandsen's opponent in the 2006 Democratic primary.

2006 When House District 8 incumbent Republican Representative Joe Murray retired and left the seat open, Froerer was unopposed for the 2006 Republican primary and won the three-way November 7, 2006 General election with 3,523 votes (52.7%) against Democratic nominee Matt Frandsen and Constitution candidate John Herbst III, who had been Representative Murray's challenger for the seat in the 2004 Republican primary.

2004 When Senate District 19 incumbent Republican Senator Dave Gladwell left the Legislature and left the seat open, Froerer was one of two candidates selected by the Republican convention for the June 22, 2004 Republican primary from among four candidates in a field which included Representative Melvin R. Brown; Froerer lost the primary to Allen M. Christensen, who went on to win the November 2, 2004 general election against Democratic nominee Jim Hasenyager.

== 2016 sponsored legislation ==
Bill number	Bill title	Status
HB0009	Revenue Bond Amendments	Governor Signed - 3/25/2016
HB0030	Good Landlord Program Amendments	Governor Signed - 3/21/2016
HB0058S02	Hemp Extract Amendments	Governor Signed - 3/21/2016
HB0072	Timeshare Amendments	Governor Signed - 3/25/2016
HB0093	Organ Donor Amendments	Governor Signed - 3/18/2016
HB0228S02	Alcohol Modifications	Governor Signed - 3/25/2016
HB0236S03	Charitable Prescription Drug Recycling Program	House/ to Governor - 3/15/2016
HB0402	Real Estate Amendments	House/ to Governor - 3/16/2016
HB0422	Common Area Assessment Amendments	House/ filed - 3/10/2016
HB0463	Personal Representative Amendments	House/ filed - 3/10/2016
HCR015	Concurrent Resolution Urging Adoption of Utah Dinosaur Days	House/ filed - 3/10/2016

Froerer passed eight of the eleven bills he introduced, giving him a 72.7% passage rate. He also floor sponsored eight bills.
