= Mark W. Walker =

American politician

Mark W. Walker is a former Republican politician in Utah. He was elected to the Utah House of Representatives in 2004 from the 45th district, in the Sandy area and re-elected in 2006. In 2008, he was a candidate in the Republican primary for Utah State Treasurer along with Richard K. Ellis, Chief Deputy State Treasurer. Ellis claimed that Walker suggested he should drop out of the race and in return, Walker (if elected) would keep Ellis on with a $56,000 pay raise. During an Ethics Committee investigation, Walker pled guilty to "inducement not to become a candidate," agreed not to run, perform 100 hours of community service and was fined. Walker then resigned his position.
