= Kraig Powell =

American politician (born 1966)

Member of the Utah House of Representatives from the 54th district
- In office January 1, 2009 – 2016
- Preceded by: Gordon E. Snow
- Succeeded by: Tim Quinn

Personal details
- Born: March 18, 1966 (age 60) Tacoma, Washington, U.S.
- Party: Republican
- Education: Willamette University (BA); University of Virginia (MA, PhD); University of Virginia School of Law (JD)
- Profession: Attorney
- Website: www.housepowell.com

Kraig J. Powell (born March 18, 1966, in Tacoma, Washington) was an American politician and a Republican member of the Utah House of Representatives representing District 54 from 2009 to 2016. In October 2016, he was appointed as a judge of the Utah 4th District Court by Utah governor Gary Herbert.

== Early life and education ==
Powell was born in Tacoma, Washington. He earned his BA in English from Willamette University, his MA and PhD in government from the University of Virginia, and his JD from the University of Virginia School of Law.. He worked as an intern for the U.S. Senate Labor Committee, a Senior Law Clerk at the Illinois Supreme Court, a briefing Attorney, Texas Court of Appeals, and a city attorney in Midway, Utah. He now lives in Heber, Utah, with his wife Kim and their four children.

== Political career and elections ==
Kraig was first elected on November 4, 2008.

- 2008 - When District 54 Republican Representative Gordon E. Snow left the Legislature and left the seat open, Powell was one of two from among three candidates selected by the Republican convention for the June 24, 2008, Republican primary, which Powell won with 2,052 votes (51.6%) and won the three-way November 4, 2008, General election with 9,353 votes (67.4%) against Democratic nominee Neil Anderton and Constitution candidate Douglas Thompson, who had run for the seat in 2004.
- 2010 - Powell was unopposed for both the June 22, 2010, Republican primary and the November 2, 2010, General election, winning with 9,540 votes.
- 2012 - Powell was unopposed in the primary elections on June 26, 2012, and won the general election on November 6, 2012, with 9,252 votes (59.3%) defeating democratic nominee Chris Robinson.
- 2014 - Powell defeated Wylder Smith in the Republican convention and won the general election on November 4, 2014, with 6,262 votes (61.8%) defeating Democratic nominee Glenn J. Wright.

During the 2016 legislative session, he served on the Public Education Appropriations Subcommittee, Retirement and Independent Entities Appropriations Subcommittee, House Political Subdivisions Committee, the House Retirement and Independent Entities Committee, and the House Education Committee.

== 2016 sponsored legislation ==
Bill Number	Bill Title	Status
HB0035	Retirement and Insurance Benefit Claims Limits	Governor Signed 3/25/16
HB0051	Recodification of Postretirement Reemployment Provisions	Governor Signed 3/28/16
HB0076	Alcoholic Beverage Service Amendments	House/ filed 3/10/16
HB0082	Property Taxing Authority for Public Water Providers	House/ filed 3/10/16
HB0091	Interest Rate Amendments	House/ filed 3/3/16
HB0092	Local School Board Levy Rate Amendments	House/ filed 3/10/16
HB0095	Political Issues Committee Amendments	Governor Signed 3/21/16
HB0122	Sales Tax Exemption for Public Buildings Contractors	House/ filed 3/10/16
HB0126S03	Unmanned Aircraft Revisions	Governor Signed 3/21/16
HB0143S01	Vehicle Safety Inspection Amendments	House/ filed 3/3/16
HB0157S02	Age Limit for Tobacco and Related Products	House/ filed 3/10/16
HB0164S01	Educational Testing Amendments	House/ filed 3/10/16
HB0175S04	Public Education Employment Amendments	Governor Signed 3/23/16
HB0193S01	Charter School Funding Amendments	House/ filed 3/10/16
HB0273	Condominium Association Amendments	Governor Signed 3/22/16
HB0299	Marriage Revisions	House/ filed 3/10/16
HB0382	Parentage Amendments	House/ filed 3/10/16
HB0481	Political Party and Election Amendments	House/ filed 3/10/16

Powell also floor sponsored two bills: SB0005S01 Retirement and Independent Entities Base Budget, SB0019 Phased Retirement, SB0020 Retirement Systems Audit Recommendations Amendments, SB0024 Utah Housing Corporation Sunset Extension, SB0029 Retirement Systems Amendments, SB0037 Human Resource Management Rate Committee, SB0208 Retirement Amendments, and SB0210S04 Unmanned Vehicle Revisions.
