= Fred Hunsaker =

American politician

Member of the Utah House of Representatives from the 4th district
- In office August 13, 2004 – December 31, 2010
- Preceded by: Loraine Pace
- Succeeded by: David Butterfield
- In office January 1, 1991 – June 17, 1997
- Succeeded by: Loraine Pace

Personal details
- Born: September 7, 1938 (age 88) Brigham City, Utah
- Party: Republican

Fred Hunsaker (born September 7, 1939) is an American politician who served in the Utah House of Representatives from the 4th district from 1991 to 1997 and from 2004 to 2010.
