= Dean Sanpei =

American politician

Member of the Utah House of Representatives from the 63rd district
- In office June 10, 2010 – August 24, 2017
- Preceded by: Stephen Clark

Personal details
- Party: Republican
- Education: Brigham Young University
- Website: deansanpei.com

Dean Sanpei is an American politician and a Republican member of the Utah House of Representatives representing District 63 since his June 10, 2010 appointment to fill the vacancy caused by the resignation of Stephen Clark. He lives in Provo with his wife, Hinckley, and their two children. He is Asian American.

== Early life and education ==
Sanpei was born into a military family. His father was a Lieutenant Colonel in the Air Force and they moved around a lot during his childhood. By the time Sanpei was in the 7th grade, he had attended seven different schools. After graduating from Brigham Young University with a Master's of Public Administration, Sanpei became the Assistant Director of Planning for Intermountain Healthcare’s Urban North Region. He was part of the core team that planned the rebuild of the McKay Dee Hospital. He worked there for several years, before going to work for the consulting group of Johnston, Zabor, McManus in North Carolina where he was a Senior Project Manager with clients spread from San Diego to New York.

In 2003, Sanpei was brought back to Provo and Intermountain Healthcare as the Director of Planning for the Urban South Region, which includes Utah Valley Regional Medical Center, Orem Community Hospital, and American Fork Hospital. In 2006 he was promoted to the central office and later became the Vice President over Planning for all of Intermountain Healthcare.

== Political career ==
Sanpei served as a precinct chair, state and county delegate, member of the executive committee, and from 2005 - 2010 he served as the Legislative District Chair for District 63. He was first elected to the Utah House of Representatives on June 10, 2010, and last elected on November 4, 2014. During the 2016 Legislative Session, served on the Executive Appropriations Committee, and the House Government Operations Committee.

== 2016 sponsored legislation ==
Bill	Status
HB 2- New Fiscal Year Supplemental Appropriations Act	Governor Line Item Veto 3/30/16
HB 3- Appropriations Adjustments	Governor Line Item Veto 3/30/16
HB 174 - Health Insurance—Athletic Trainer Services	House/ filed 3/10/16
HB 207 - Fourth District Juvenile Court Judge	Governor Signed 3/17/16
HB 371 - Human Services Licensee and Contractor Screening Amendments	Governor Signed 3/21/16
HB 392 - Executive Appropriations Committee Report Amendments	Governor Signed 3/23/16
HJR 7 - Joint Rules Resolution on Medicaid Funding Report	House/ to Lieutenant Governor 3/15/16

Sanpei also floor sponsored SB 2 Public Education Budget Amendments, SB 3 Current Fiscal Year Supplemental Appropriations, SB 7 National Guard, Veterans' Affairs, and Legislature Base Budget, SJR 8 Joint Rules Resolution on Performance Notes, and SJR 9 Joint Rules Resolution on Request for Appropriations Process Change.

== Elections ==
- 2016 Sanpei won in the general election by 79.2% of the vote in November against Nathan Smith Jones.
- 2014 Sanpei won the Republican nomination by 71% of the vote in April against Colby Johnson and then went on to win in the November General Election unopposed.
- 2012 Sanpei won both the June 26, 2012 Republican primary and the November 6, 2012 General election, winning with 5,057 votes.
- 2010 Sanpei was chosen from among three candidates by the Republican convention and won the November 2, 2010 General election with 57.6% against Democratic candidate Donald Jarvis, who had run for the seat in 2008.
