= Glenn A. Donnelson =

American politician

Glenn A. Donnelson is a former member of the Utah House of Representatives, serving as a Republican from 2001 to 2008. While in office, he was the sponsor of a 2007 bill that made it so people without legal residency in the United States could not be granted in-state tuition at educational institutions in Utah.

== Sources ==
- Vote Smart report on bill sponsored by Donnelson
