= Ralph Okerlund =

American politician (1952–2024)

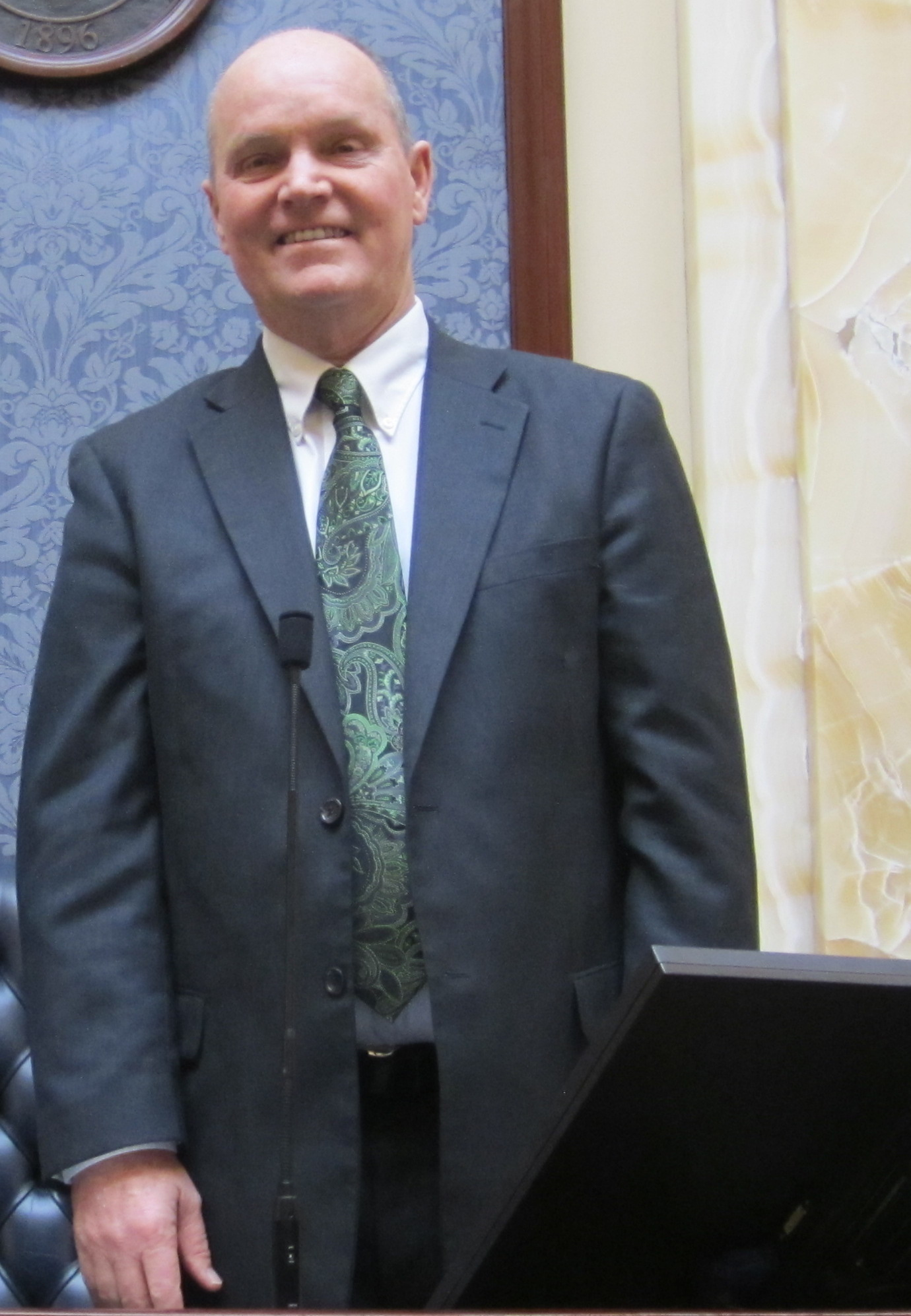
- Okerlund in 2013

Majority Leader of the Utah Senate
- In office January 28, 2013 – December 31, 2020
- Preceded by: Scott K. Jenkins
- Succeeded by: Evan Vickers

Member of the Utah Senate from the 24th district
- In office January 1, 2009 – December 30, 2020
- Preceded by: Darin Peterson
- Succeeded by: Derrin Owens

Personal details
- Born: July 28, 1952 Salina, Utah, U.S.
- Died: October 9, 2024 (aged 72) Monroe, Utah, U.S.
- Party: Republican
- Education: Dixie State University; University of Utah (BA)

Ralph Ole Okerlund (July 28, 1952 – October 9, 2024) was an American politician and a Republican member of the Utah State Senate that represented District 24 from 2009 to 2020. He was the Senate's majority leader from January 28, 2013, to 2020.

== Background ==
Okerlund earned his AA from Dixie State College (now Utah Tech University) and his BS in political science from the University of Utah. He has worked in agriculture. Okerlund was married to his wife, Cindy and they have three children. He died on October 9, 2024 at the age of 72.

== Political career ==
Before he was a senator, Okerlund was on the Monroe City Council, served as Monroe City Mayor and the Sevier County Commissioner, was president of Utah State Association of Commissioners and Councilmen, and was president of Utah Association of Counties. Okerlund was elected to the Senate in 2008.

In 2016, Okerlund served on the following committees:

- Executive Appropriations Committee
- Executive Offices and Criminal Justice Appropriations Subcommittee
- Natural Resources, Agriculture, and Environmental Quality Appropriations Subcommittee
- Senate Economic Development and Workforce Services Committee
- Senate Natural Resources, Agriculture, and Environment Committee

During the 2014 General Session, Okerlund was conducting a meeting with House and Senate GOP leaders when he stepped out into the hallway and apparently passed out. He said he had felt light-headed. He was not able to return for the last two days of the session.

== Elections ==
2016 Utah State Senate election District 24
Party	Candidate	Votes	%
Republican	Ralph Okerlund (unopposed)	--	--

2012 Utah State Senate election District 24
Party	Candidate	Votes	%
Republican	Ralph Okerlund	29,588	86.4%
Constitution	Trestin Meacham	4,647	13.6%

2008 Utah State Senate election District 24
Party	Candidate	Votes	%
Republican	Ralph Okerlund	19,073	67.60%
Democratic	Tobiah Dillon	6,571	22.9%

== Legislation ==
=== 2016 sponsored bills ===
Bill Number	Bill Title	Bill Status
S.B. 63	Survey Monument Replacement	Governor Signed 3/22/2016
S.B. 70	Insurance Modifications	Senate/Filed for bills not passed 3/10/2016
S.B. 71	Children's Justice Center Amendments	Governor Signed 3/25/2016
S.B. 102	High Cost Infrastructure Amendments	Governor Signed 3/28/2016
S.B. 134	Oil and Gas Conservation Account Amendments	Sent to Governor 3/15/2016
S.B. 144	Dead and Domestic Animal Disposal Amendments	Governor Signed 3/17/2016
S.B. 147	Revisor's Technical Corrections to Utah Code	Governor Signed 3/28/2016
S.B. 205	Ethics Revisions	Governor Signed 3/28/2016
S.B. 257	Public-Private Partnership Amendments	Senate/Filed for bills not passed 3/10/2016
S.B. 258	Distribution of Local Sales Tax Revenue	Governor Signed 3/28/2016
SCR 4	Concurrent Resolution- Old Spanish Trail Designation	Governor Signed 3/1/2016
SCR 10	Communications Spectrum Translator System Concurrent Resolution	Governor Signed 3/10/2016
SCR 14	Concurrent Resolution Designating Utah Broadcasters Awareness Week	Governor Signed 3/18/2016
SJR 5	Joint Resolution Authorizing Pay of In-session Employees	Sent to Lt. Gov 2/19/2016

Senator Okerlund was the Floor Sponsor for the following bills:

- H.B. 31 Enterprise Zone Amendments
- H.B. 52 Office of Outdoor Recreation Amendments
- H.B. 86 Postretirement Employment Restrictions
- H.B. 110 Election Law Changes
- H.B. 154 County Personnel Requirements
- H.B. 169 Little Sahara State Park Designation
- H.B. 217 Small School Funding
- H.B. 219 Resource Management Planning
- H.B. 266 Unclaimed Capital Credits Amendments
- H.B. 283 Public Utility Easement Amendments
- H.B. 287 Commission for the Stewardship of Public Lands and Private Donations for Public Lands Litigation
- H.B. 341 Interlocal Cooperation Act Amendments
- H.B. 479 Jail Contracting Rate Amendments
- HCR 2 Concurrent Resolution Recognizing the 40th Anniversary of the Utah Indoor Clean Air Act
- HJR 5 Joint Rules Resolution on Redistricting Standards

=== Notable legislation ===
In 2014, Senator Okerlund sponsored S.B. 88 Substitute Child Interview Amendments, which clarifies the right of child victims to keep confidential their interviews that are conducted at a Children's Justice Center, including video and audio recordings, and transcripts of those recordings. This bill helps protect children who have suffered from abuse. It was passed and signed by the Governor.

Utah State Senate
Preceded by Scott K. Jenkins	Majority Leader of the Utah Senate; 2013–2019	Succeeded by Evan Vickers
