= Gordon E. Snow =

American politician (born 1946)

Utah State Representative
- In office 1999–2008
- Constituency: State House, District 54

Personal details
- Born: September 22, 1946 (age 79)
- Party: Republican Party
- Relatives: Marlon O. Snow (brother)
- Occupation: General Contractor

Gordon E. Snow (born September 22, 1946) is an American politician from Utah. A Republican, he was a member of the Utah State House, representing the state's 54th house district in Roosevelt from 1999 until his retirement in 2008. He served as the Majority Whip in the Utah House from 2006 to 2008.

Snow is a Latter-day Saint and a graduate of Utah State University.
