= Bradley Last =

American politician and a Republican member of the Utah House of Representatives

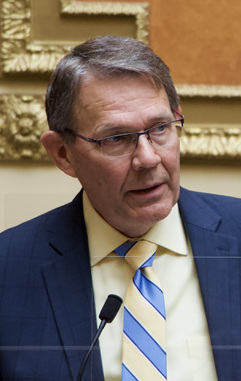

Member of the Utah House of Representatives from the 71st district
- In office January 1, 2003 – December 31, 2022
- Preceded by: Max Young
- Succeeded by: Rex Shipp

Personal details
- Party: Republican
- Education: University of Utah

Bradley 'Brad' G. Last is an American politician and a former Republican member of the Utah House of Representatives representing District 71.

== Education and career ==
Last earned his bachelor's degree and MBA from the University of Utah. Representative Last lives in Hurricane, Utah, where he works as the Vice President of Development at Utah Tech University. Last also served on the Washington County Board of Education from 1994 until 2002.

== Political career ==
- 2002 When District 71 Democratic Representative Max Young left the Legislature and left the seat open, Last ran in the June 25, 2002 Republican Primary, winning with 1,919 votes (56%) against former Representative Dennis Iverson and won the November 5, 2002 General election with 6,487 votes (75.4%) against Democratic nominee Phillip Bimstein; the votes columns are reversed.
- 2004 Last was challenged but selected by the Republican convention for the November 2, 2004 General election, which he won with 11,134 votes (87.6%) against Libertarian candidate Jedidiah Stout.
- 2006 Last was unopposed for the 2006 Republican Primary and won the three-way November 7, 2006 General election with 6,808 votes (70.8%) against Democratic nominee Colt Smith and Constitution candidate Philip Jensen, who had run for Utah State Senate in 2004.
- 2008 Last was unopposed for the June 24, 2008 Republican Primary and won the four-way November 4, 2008 General election with 11,885 votes (71.4%) against Democratic nominee Lyman Whitaker, Constitution candidate Michael Ferrin, and Libertarian candidate Aric Cramer.
- 2010 Last was unopposed for both the June 22, 2010 Republican Primary and the November 2, 2010 General election, winning with 10,547 votes.
- 2012 Last was unopposed for the June 26, 2012 Republican Primary and won the three-way November 6, 2012 General election with 10,546 votes (77.9%) against Democratic nominee Billy Kell and Constitution candidate Paul Sevy.
- 2014 Last was unopposed for the 2014 Republican convention and won the November 4, 2016 general election against Democratic nominee Ken Anderson with 6,782 votes (81.8%).
- During the 2022 legislative sessions, Representative Last served on the Executive Appropriations Committee, Public Education Appropriations Subcommittee, and House Education Committee.

== Notable legislation ==
- 2022- Representative Last was heavily involved in crafting Utah's budget bill for the 2022 General Session. He ran HB 3 which supplements or reduces appropriations otherwise provided for the support and operation of state government for the fiscal year beginning July 1, 2021 and ending June 30, 2022 and for the fiscal year beginning July 1, 2022 and ending June 30, 2023.
- 2022- Representative Last also ran HB 323 which authorizes certain counties to use a certain amount of transient room tax revenue for visitor management and destination development if the expenditure is prioritized and recommended by a county's tourism tax advisory board; modifies provisions related to a transient room tax reserve fund; modifies the general powers and duties of a county legislative body related to the transient room tax; and modifies provisions related to an annual report by a county legislative body.

== 2022 sponsored legislation ==
Bill number	Bill name	Bill status
HB 2	New Fiscal Year Supplemental Appropriations Act	Governor signed - 3/23/22
HB 3	Appropriations Adjustments	Governor Signed - 3/24/22
HB 323	Transient Room Tax Amendments	Governor signed - 3/24/22
HB 475	Use of Public Education Stabilization Account One-time Funding	Governor signed - 3/24/22
HB 478	Minimum Basic Tax Rate Reduction	House/ filed - 3/4/22

During the 2022 General Session, Representative Last also floor sponsored SB 3 Current Fiscal Year Supplemental Appropriations, SB 7 National Guard, Veterans Affairs, and Legislature Base Budget, SB 127 Early Literacy Outcomes Improvement, SB 168 Commission for Student-centered Public Education Amendments, and SB 245 School Turnaround Program Revisions.
