= Curtis Oda =

American politician (born 1953)

Member of the Utah House of Representatives from the 14th district
- In office January 2005 – January 2017
- Preceded by: Don Bush
- Succeeded by: Karianne Lisonbee

Personal details
- Born: January 4, 1953 (age 73) Ogden, Utah, U.S.
- Party: Republican
- Spouse: Nancy
- Children: 3
- Education: Utah State University; Weber State College

Curtis Oda (born January 4, 1953) is an American politician and a former Republican member of the Utah House of Representatives. He represented District 14 from January 2005 through January 2017.

== Early life, education, and career ==
Oda was born in Ogden, Utah. He is of Japanese descent and had relatives who were interned during World War II. Oda attended Clearfield High School, and later attended both Weber State University and Utah State University, where he earned degrees in both business administration and economics, and business management and economics. He has been working as a private/casualty insurance agent since 1974, and currently works for Heiners Insurance Center. Oda and his wife, Nancy, live in Clearfield, Utah and have three children.

== Political career ==
Oda served as a State Delegate from 1991 to 2001 and a Davis County Delegate from 1991 to 2003 for the Republican Party. He also served as a member of the Davis County Republican Party Platform Committee from 1997 to 2003, and as a member of the Clearfield City Council from 1996 to 2003. He was first elected to the Utah House of Representatives on November 2, 2004. During the 2016 legislative session, he served on the House Health and Human Services Committee, and the House Law Enforcement and Criminal Justice Committee.

== 2016 sponsored legislation ==
Bill Number	Bill Title	Status
HB0012	Disaster Recovery for Local Governments	Governor Signed - 3/22/2016
HB0013	Alcoholic Beverage Event Permit Amendments	Governor Signed - 3/18/2016
HB014	Emergency Services Account Loan Amendments	Governor Signed - 3/21/2016
HB0049	State Liability Protection for School	Governor Signed - 3/23/2016
HB103S01	Department of Administrative Services Amendments	Governor Signed - 3/23/2016
HB0258S02	Solid Waste Amendments	House/ to Governor - 3/15/2016
HB0410	Military Tuition Waiver Amendments	House/ filed - 3/10/2016
HB0442	Abortion Amendments	House/ filed - 3/10/2016
HB0453S01	Bail Bond Recovery Act Amendments	House/ filed - 3/10/2016
HB0472S01	Gun Owners Privacy Protection Amendments	House/ filed - 3/10/2016

Oda passed six of the ten bills introduced, giving him a 60% passage rate. He also floor sponsored five Senate bills.

== Elections ==
- 2014 Oda challenged Democrat Cheryl Lynn Phipps in the general election, which he won with 3,386 votes (66.9%) to Phipps's 1,677 votes (3.1%).
- 2012 Oda was challenged but selected by the Republican convention for the November 6, 2012 general election, which he won with 7,490 votes (71.2%) against Democratic nominee Jon Christensen.
- 2002 Oda was one of two challengers for District 14 incumbent Republican Representative Don Bush, but Representative Bush went on to win the November 5, 2002 general election against Democratic nominee Todd Weber.
- 2004 Oda was one of three challengers for Representative Bush, and was one of two selected by the Republican convention for the June 22, 2004 Republican primary, which Oda won with 874 votes (62.6%) and won the November 2, 2004 general election with 4,452 votes (80.4%) against Democratic nominee Tab Uno.
- 2006 Oda was unopposed for the 2006 Republican primary and won the November 7, 2006 general election with 2,614 votes (63.8%) against Democratic nominee Lawrence Abel, who had run for Utah State Senate in 2002.
- 2008 Oda was challenged but selected by the Republican convention for the November 4, 2008 general election, which Oda won with 5,280 votes (64%) against Democratic nominee Marcie West.
- 2010 Oda was unopposed for the June 22, 2010 Republican primary, and won the November 2, 2010 general election with 3,005 votes (65.9%) against Democratic nominee Christopher Williams, his Republican challenger from 2008.
