= Michael Morley (politician) =

American politician

Member of the Utah House of Representatives from the 66th district
- In office 2003 – January 1, 2013
- Succeeded by: Mike McKell

Personal details
- Born: Price, Utah
- Party: Republican
- Spouse: Krystin
- Children: 9

Michael T. Morley is an American politician from the state of Utah. A member of the Republican Party, he served in the Utah House of Representatives. He did not seek reelection in 2012.

Born in Price, Utah, Morley resides in Spanish Fork, Utah. He and his wife, Krystin, have nine children.
