= Wayne L. Niederhauser =

American politician

Wayne Niederhauser
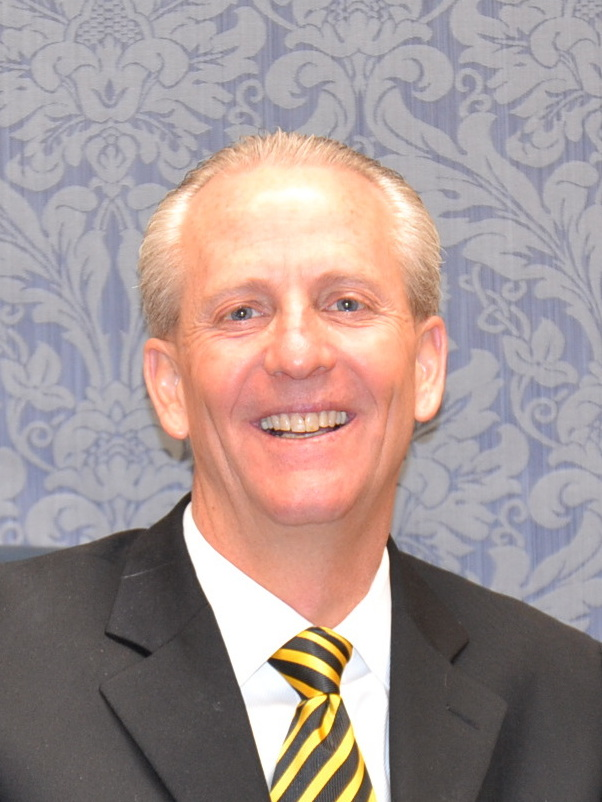

President of the Utah Senate
- In office January 28, 2013 – January 28, 2019
- Preceded by: Michael Waddoups
- Succeeded by: J. Stuart Adams

Member of the Utah Senate from the 9th district
- In office July 2006 – January 28, 2019
- Preceded by: Al Mansell
- Succeeded by: Kirk Cullimore Jr.

Personal details
- Born: October 1, 1959 (age 66)
- Party: Republican
- Spouse: Melissa
- Children: 5
- Education: Utah State University, Logan (BS, MS)

Wayne Larry Niederhauser (born October 1, 1959) is an American politician and certified public accountant from Utah. A Republican, he served as a member of the Utah State Senate from 2006 to 2018, representing the state's 9th senate district in Salt Lake County including the cities of Sandy and Draper. From 2013 to 2019, he served as President of the Utah State Senate.

== Early life, education, and career ==
Niederhauser has bachelor's and master's degrees in accounting from the Jon M. Huntsman School of Business at Utah State University. Niederhauser and his wife Melissa met at Utah State University. They have five children, Christian (Lisa), Sarah, Molly, Ethan, and Emma. Niederhauser is a certified public accountant, small business owner, real estate developer, and has worked as an adjunct professor at Westminster College. Niederhauser is also an owner of CW Management Corporation, a real estate development company located in West Jordan.

Niederhauser is a member of the American Legislative Exchange Council (ALEC), serving as Utah state leader. He is also affiliated with the Home Builders Association and Organized Fundraising Events for Boys and Girls Club, Primary Children's Hospital, and Make-A-Wish Foundation. He is a member of the Church of Jesus Christ of Latter-day Saints.

== Accomplishments and associations ==
- 2009 ALEC Legislator of the Year
- 2008 CSG Toll Fellow
- Envision Utah Board Member
- Salt Lake Convention and Visitors Bureau board member
- 2004 Governor's Quality Growth Award of Merit for Planning and Design
- Shakespeare Festival Board

== Political career ==
In addition to his service in the Utah Senate, Niederhauser is a board member for Envision Utah, the Sports Commission, the Visit Salt Lake Board (local CVB), and the Shakespearean Festival Board. In November 2012 he was elected Senate President. In 2016 Niederhauser served on the following committees:

- Executive Appropriations Committee
- Executive Offices and Criminal Justice Appropriations Subcommittee
- Public Education Appropriations Subcommittee
- Senate Education Committee
- Senate Revenue and Taxation Committee
- Legislative Management Committee

=== Election ===
==== 2014 ====
2014 Utah State Senate election District 9
Party	Candidate	Votes	%
Republican	Wayne Niederhauser	15,822	61.4%
Democratic	Kathryn Gustafson	9,943	38.6%

== Legislation ==
Bill Title and Number	Status
S.C.R. 17 Concurrent Resolution Recognizing Utah's Ten Year Relationship with Liaoning, China	2/26/2016

Political offices
Preceded by Michael Waddoups	President of the Utah Senate; 2013–2019	Succeeded by J. Stuart Adams
