= Jen Seelig =

American politician

Member of the Utah House of Representatives from the 23rd district
- In office 2006–2014
- Preceded by: Duane Bourdeaux
- Succeeded by: Sandra Hollins

Personal details
- Born: 1969 or 1970 (age 56–57)
- Party: Democratic Party
- Education: University of Louisville; University of Utah
- Occupation: Public policy, public relations

Jennifer M. "Jen" Seelig (born 1969/1970) is a former Democratic member of the Utah State House of Representatives, who represented the 23rd District from 2006 to 2014. She lives in Salt Lake City. She is currently working in the Salt Lake City Mayor's Office as the Director of Community Relations.

== Early life and education ==
Seelig has a bachelor's degree from the University of Louisville and an MPA from the University of Utah.

== Political career ==
Representative Seelig was elected November 6, 2012. During the 2014 General Session, she served as the Minority Leader for the House Democrats. She also served on the House Law Enforcement and Criminal Justice Committee, and the House Political Subdivisions Committee.

== 2014 Sponsored Legislation ==
Bill	Status
HB 90- Women in the Economy Commission	Passed, signed by Governor 3/29/14
HB 157- Rape Kit Processing Amendments	Passed, signed by Governor 3/31/14
HB 254- Human Trafficking Victim Amendments	Passed, signed by Governor 3/29/14
HB 264- Disabled Parking Fine Amendments	Passed, Signed by Governor 3/20/14
HB 339- County Budget Amendments	Passed, signed by Governor 3/27/14
HCR 12- Concurrent Resolution Recognizing the 30th Anniversary of the Sundance Institute	Failed in the Senate Rules Committee
HJR 13- Joint Rules Resolution on the Conference Committee Reports	Failed in the Senate Rules Committee
HR 4- House Rules Resolution Banning Fundraising on the Floor	Passed

Representative Seelig did not floor sponsor any legislation during 2014.

== Pivotal Legislation ==
During the 2014 General Session, Representative Seelig ran a few bills that are considered "pivotal". HB 90, the Commission on Women in the Economy, received much attention from the media and from Utah citizens. HB 157, Rape Kit Processing Amendments, passed, but was open to much debate on the floor.
