= Lynn Hemingway =

American politician

Member of the Utah House of Representatives from the 40th district
- In office 2006–2018
- Succeeded by: Stephanie Pitcher

Personal details
- Born: May 10
- Party: Democratic Party
- Spouse: Sherma

Lynn N. Hemingway is an American politician who served as a Democratic member of the Utah House of Representatives, representing the 40th District in Salt Lake, Utah. Hemingway was elected in to the Utah House of Representatives in 2006, and served through 2018.

== Early life and career ==
Hemingway studied at Westminster College and the University of Utah. In 2002, Hemingway retired from the Williams Company. His wife works as a real estate office manager.

== Elections ==
- 2006 Hemmingway was unopposed for the 2006 Democratic Primary and won the November 7, 2006 General election with 4,618 votes against Republican nominee Duane Millard.
- 2008 Hemmingway was unopposed for the June 2008 Democratic Primary and won the November 4, 2008 General election with 4,719 votes (54.1%) against Republican nominee Daniel Marriot.
- 2010 Hemmingway was unopposed for the June 2010 Democratic Primary and won the three-way November 2, 2010 General election with 4,279 votes (49.8%) against Republican nominee Val Bateman and Libertarian Sandra Johnson.
- 2012 Hemmingway was unopposed for the June 26, 2012 Democratic Primary and won the November 6, 2012 General election with 8,777 votes (59.7%) against Republican nominee Grace Sperry.

In March 2014, Hemingway announced that he would not be seeking reelection.

However, on November 13, 2015, Hemingway was appointed to the House by Governor Gary Herbert, replacing former State Representative Justin Miller.

== Tenure ==
During the 2016 legislative session, Hemingway served on the Retirement and Independent Entities Committee, the Infrastructure and General Government Appropriations Subcommittee, the House Public Utilities and Technology Committee, the House Political Subdivisions Committee, and the House Retirement and Independent Entities Committee. During the interim, Hemingway serves on the Natural Resources, Agriculture, and Environment Interim Committee Interim, the Public Utilities, Energy, and Technology Interim Committee, and the Retirement and Independent Entities Interim Committee, He is also a representative on the Utah International Relations and Trade Commission.

== Electoral Record ==
2006 Utah House of Representatives election, District 40
Party	Candidate	Votes	%
Democratic	Lynn Hemingway	4,618	58.91
Republican	Duana B. Millard	3,221	41.09
Total votes		7,839	100

2008 Utah House of Representatives election, District 40
Party	Candidate	Votes	%
Democratic	Lynn Hemingway	6,697	55.64
Republican	Daniel Marriott	5,339	44.36
Total votes		12,036	100

2010 Utah House of Representatives election, District 40
Party	Candidate	Votes	%
Democratic	Lynn Hemingway	4,279	49.8
Republican	Val J. Bateman	3,836	44.65
Libertarian Party (U.S.)	Sandra Johnson	477	5.55
Total votes		8,592	100

2012 Utah House of Representatives election, District 40
Party	Candidate	Votes	%
Democratic	Lynn Hemingway	8,777	59.7
Republican	Grace Sperry	5,929	40.3
Total votes		14,706	100

2016 Utah House of Representatives election, District 40
Party	Candidate	Votes	%
Democratic	Lynn Hemingway	10,404	67.29
Republican	Joseph F. Breault	5,058	32.71
Total votes		15,462	100

== 2016 sponsored legislation ==
Bill number	Bill name	Bill status
HB0135S1	State Parks Fee Exemption Amendments	Governor Signed - 3/22/2016
HB0195	Living Wage Amendments	House/ filed - 3/10/2016

Hemingway also floor sponsored SB0253 Animal Shelter Revisions.
