= Stephen Sandstrom =

American politician (born 1964)

Member of the Utah House of Representatives from the 58th district
- In office 2007–2012
- Succeeded by: Keven Stratton

Personal details
- Born: 1964 (age 61–62)
- Party: Republican
- Education: Brigham Young University

Stephen Eric Sandstrom (born 1964) is a licensed architect, a former politician and was a member of the Utah House of Representatives from 2007 through 2012. Prior to serving in the Utah Legislature, he was a member of the Orem City Council from 1994 through 2006. He has a bachelor's degree in political science from Brigham Young University, but has largely worked in architecture and is a 4th generation architect.

== Early life ==
Sandstorm spent his childhood in a politically active home. As a boy Stephen once rode his bicycle into Provo, where he came across campaign literature and decided to help distribute this literature. A short time later, he was awarded the Boy Scouts of America's Eagle Scout award. As a young man he heard a POW speak, which influenced his desire to join the military. At 17 he earned his pilot's licence and at age 19 he left to serve a Latter-Day Saints mission. After his Mission, he joined the military.

== Career ==
He started working for his father's architectural firm at a young age and also pursued his dream of being a pilot, receiving the license aged 17. He also became involved in politics. Later he became a part of the Orem city council. He is a member of the Utah house of representatives.

As a Utah representative, Stephen was a strong proponent of public education He also passed significant legislation to further 2nd Amendment Rights. He built a record of fighting against gambling, identity theft, and restriction to use of public lands. In 2010, Sandstrom announced that he was drafting immigration legislation similar to Arizona's controversial immigration law, SB 1070. He later reversed his position on unauthorized immigration and called for the passage of the DREAM Act.

== Personal life ==
He is married to Jennie Sandstrom (1990) and they have four children and two grandchildren.

== Congressional campaign ==
He decided to leave his seat in the Utah Legislature in 2012 and run for Congress in the newly created 4th Congressional District. On April 21, 2012, at the Utah Republican Convention, Sandstrom was defeated by Mia Love as nominee to run for Utah's 4th District congressional seat. After spending nearly 18 years in political office, he officially retired from politics and now concentrates his efforts on his architectural career and pursuing his mountain climbing ambitions and spending time in the outdoors.
