= Douglas Aagard =

American politician (born 1954)

Utah State Representative
- In office 2000–2011
- Constituency: State House, District 15

Personal details
- Born: Douglas Conrad Aagard; October 19, 1954 (age 71)
- Party: Republican
- Spouse: Denise
- Education: Brigham Young University; Westminster College (MBA)
- Occupation: Mortgage Banking

Douglas Conard Aagard (born October 19, 1954) is an American politician from Utah. A Republican, he was a member of the Utah House of Representatives, representing the state's 15th house district in Kaysville until his retirement in 2011. Prior to retiring, Aagard served as House majority leader following the resignation of Kevin Garn.

Aagard received his bachelor's degree from Brigham Young University. He has an associate degree from Snow College and an MBA from Westminster College. He spent much of his career as a mortgage banker.

During his time in the State House, he sponsored 20 bills, including HB 327 (Building Inspector Amendments), HB 337 (Judicial Code Amendments), and HB 263 (Insurance Fraud Related Amendments). He also co-sponsored 7 bills. 9 out of the 10 Bills he sponsored passed, the only one to fail being HB 263.

Aagard also spent time as an oil painter prior to his time as a politician. His work won several state and local awards. His art has been shown in galleries in Arizona, Colorado, New Mexico, Wyoming, and his home state of Utah. He has had solo exhibitions in Park City, Alpine, Ogden and Provo Utah, as well as Palm Desert, California, Ruidoso, New Mexico, and Scottsdale, Arizona.
