= Ronda Rudd Menlove =

American politician (born 1952)

Member of the Utah House of Representatives from the 1st district
- In office 2005–2014

Personal details
- Born: March 18, 1952 (age 74)
- Party: Republican
- Spouse(s): Martell Menlove; 5 children
- Occupation: Vice Provost, Utah State University

Ronda Rudd Menlove (born March 18, 1952) is an American politician from Utah. A Republican, she was a member of the Utah House, representing the state's 1st house district in Box Elder County. She is Vice Provost of Utah State University.

== Early life and career ==
Ronda Rudd married Martell Menlove and the couple had five children. She graduated magna cum laude from Utah State University in 1973 with a degree in Spanish and a minor in History, focusing in Latin American Studies. After graduating from Utah State University. Menlove attended Indiana University Bloomington, where she worked as a Spanish Graduate Teaching Assistant. Menlove graduated with an M.S. in Secondary Education. She later earned her Ph.D. in Special Education from Utah State University in 1999.

Menlove has served as a teacher in the Granite School District, Tooele County School District, Rich County School District, and has held several positions at Utah State University since 1989 where she currently serves as the Vice Provost for Regional Campuses and Distance Education. She was elected to the Utah Legislature in 2004 and was re-elected to the Utah House in District 1 in 2006. Menlove has served as an Election Judge, and as a County and State Delegate to the Republican Party Convention and has served as a Utah State Representative since 2005.

== Political career ==
During the 2013 and 2014 legislative sessions, Menlove served on the Social Services Appropriations Subcommittee, the House Health and Human Services Committee, the House Economic Development and Workforce Services Committee, the House Ethics Committee, and the House Rules Committee. During the interim, she served on the Economic Development and Workforce Services Interim Committee and the Health and Human Services Interim Committee. Menlove also participated in the Child Welfare Legislative Oversight Panel and the Utah Constitutional Revision Commission.

== 2014 Sponsored Legislation ==
| Bill number | Bill name | Bill status |
|---|---|---|
| HB0013 | Rural Waste Disposal | Governor Signed - 4/1/2014 |
| HB0088 | Autism Program Amendments | Governor Signed - 4/1/2014 |
| HB0092S01 | Utah Education and Telehealth Network Amendments | Governor Signed - 3/27/2014 |
| HB0146S03 | Child Care Amendments | House/ filed - 3/13/2014 |
| HB0197 | Daylight Saving Time Study | Governor Signed - 4/2/2014 |
| HB0283S03 | Nonprofit Entity Receipt of Government Money | Governor Signed - 4/1/2014 |
| HB0291S01 | State Laboratory Drug Testing Account Amendments | Governor Signed - 4/1/2014 |
| HB0292 | School Grading - Calculation of High School Graduation Rate | House/ filed - 3/13/2014 |
| HB0309 | State Veterinarian Amendments | Governor Signed - 3/25/2014 |
| HB0321 | Refugee Services Coordination Amendments | Governor Signed - 3/31/2014 |
| HB0357S01 | Budgetary Amendments | Became Law Without Governor's Signature - 4/2/2014 |

Menlove also floor sponsored:

- SB0008S01 Social Services Base Budget
- SB0042 Early Childhood Education
- SB0081S01 Permanent State Trust Fund Amendments
- SB0084 Amendments to Governor's Rural Boards
- SB0098 Paraeducator Funding
- SB0104 Improvement of Reading Instruction
- SB0126 Child Welfare Amendments
- SB0140 Advanced Placement Test Funding
- SB0255 Social Work Amendments
