= David Litvack =

American politician (born 1972)

Member of the Utah House of Representatives from the 26th district
- In office 2000–2012
- Succeeded by: Angela Romero

Personal details
- Born: April 25, 1972 (age 54) Minneapolis, Minnesota, U.S.
- Party: Democratic
- Spouse: Erin Litvack
- Children: Two
- Education: University of Chicago (M.A.); Westminster College (B.S.)
- Occupation: Director, Salt Lake County Criminal Justice Advisory Council (CJAC)

David E. Litvack (born April 25, 1972) is a former Democratic member of the Utah State House of Representatives, who represented the state's 26th house district in central Salt Lake City and part of West Valley City, from 2000 through 2012. He was the minority leader in the Utah House.

== Early years ==
Litvack was born in Minneapolis, Minnesota.

== Education ==
Litvack obtained his BS in psychology/sociology from Westminster College in 1994 where he is also a current Alumni Board member. He obtained his MA in social sciences from the University of Chicago in 1996.

== Religion ==
David Litvack is Jewish.

== Family ==
Litvack and his wife Erin have two children named Gabriel and Addison and they currently reside in Salt Lake City.

== See also ==
- List of Utah State Legislatures
- Utah Democratic Party
