= Dennis E. Stowell =

American politician and chemical engineer

Member of the Utah Senate from the 28th district
- In office January 15, 2007 – April 17, 2011
- Preceded by: Thomas V. Hatch

Personal details
- Born: June 18, 1944 Ogden, UT
- Died: April 17, 2011 (aged 66)
- Spouse: Marilee
- Occupation: Chemical Engineer
- Website: Legislative Website

Dennis E. Stowell (June 18, 1944 – April 17, 2011) was an American politician and chemical engineer from Utah. A Republican, he was a member of the Utah State Senate, representing the state's 28th senate district in Beaver, Garfield, Iron, Kane, Millard, and Washington Counties.

Stowell earned bachelor's and master's degrees in chemical engineering from Brigham Young University. He also served as Mayor of Parowan, Utah.
