= Rebecca Chavez-Houck =

American politician

Member of the Utah House of Representatives from the 24th district
- In office 2008–2018
- Preceded by: Ralph Becker
- Succeeded by: Jennifer Dailey-Provost

Personal details
- Party: Democratic
- Spouse: Martin Houck
- Education: University of Utah

Rebecca Chavez-Houck is a former Democratic member of the Utah State House of Representatives who represented House District 24 from 2008 through 2018.

== Early life and career ==
Chavez-Houck graduated from Bingham High School in 1978. She later earned a BA and an MPA both from the University of Utah. She currently lives in Salt Lake City with her husband Martin and two children and works in public relations. She is an Episcopalian.

== Political career ==
In January 2008 Chavez-Houck was appointed to fill the vacancy caused by Ralph Becker becoming mayor of Salt Lake City. Chavez-Houck was elected to a full term in the legislature in November 2008. She served as minority whip during the 2014 legislative session.

During the 2016 legislative session, Chavez-Houck served on the Executive Appropriations Committee, the Social Services Appropriations Subcommittee, the House Health and Human Services Committee and the House Government and Operations Committee.

== 2016 sponsored legislation ==
Bill number	Bill title	Status
HB0241	Computer Abuse and Data Recovery Act	Governor Signed - 3/23/2016
HB0264	End of Life Options Act	House/ filed - 3/10/2016
HB0285	Board of Examiners Meeting Notice Amendments	Governor Signed - 3/21/2016
HB0313	Redistricting Provisions	House/ filed - 3/10/2016
HB0328	Housing and Homeless Amendments	Governor Signed - 3/22/2016
HJR019	Joint Resolution for Medicaid Expansion Opinion Question	House/ filed - 3/10/2016

Chavez-Houck passed three of the six bills she introduced, giving her a 50% passage rate. She also floor sponsored two Senate bills.

Chavez-Houck introduced HB0264 during the 2016 legislative session that moved to allow for assisted-suicide options. A similar version of the bill had died in the previous year and it also died in the 2016 general session.
