= Richard A. Greenwood =

American politician

Richard Greenwood

Member of the Utah House of Representatives from the 12th district
- In office April 27, 2007 – December 31, 2014
- Preceded by: D. Gregg Buxton
- Succeeded by: Mike Schultz

Personal details
- Born: Roy, Utah
- Party: Republican
- Spouse: Dessa Rae Greenwood
- Education: FBI National Academy, Miami Dade College; Weber State University Graduate of the FBI National Academy
- Profession: Law Enforcement

Richard A. Greenwood is a former Republican member of the Utah House of Representatives, representing District 12. In 2007, Greenwood was appointed to replace D. Gregg Buxton, who resigned to take a position in the executive branch of the Utah government.

== Early life and career ==
Greenwood was born on November 6. Greenwood attended Miami Dade College and Weber State University.

Greenwood is also a graduate of the Southeast Florida Institute of Criminal Justice and the FBI National Academy.

In 1971 Greenwood was drafted into the United States Army where he completed basic training at Ft. Lewis in Washington State. Greenwood was transferred to Ft. Gordon where he successfully completed training as a Military Policeman. He was then transferred to California where he was eventually assigned to the Army's Criminal Investigation Division.

In 1973, after being discharged from the United States Army, Greenwood moved to Miami, Florida where he was hired by Miami-Dade Police Department as a police officer. Greenwood was assigned to work in Central District (Liberty City).

In 1977 Greenwood moved to Utah and was hired by the Utah Highway patrol as a field trooper in the Weber County area and charged with the duties of: providing law enforcement services such as accident and criminal investigations, special enforcement activities, court testimony, first aid, coordinate and/or assist in enforcement and task force efforts with other law enforcement agencies, assist in providing training, present educational programs.

In 1987 Greenwood was transferred to Salt Lake City training section where developed and recommend policy and procedures on Accident Reconstruction and Investigation. He supervised UHP troopers in accident investigations; planned and develops lesson material; implemented training courses for in-service training for UHP sworn personnel and other requesting police agencies. Greenwood trained police instructors from other agencies on how to manage their respective department accident investigation program; taught accident investigation classes at POST (Police Academy) and Weber State University. Greenwood consulted with prosecuting attorneys and assist with prosecution of criminal litigation; acted as a consultant to the Utah Attorney General's office regarding litigation claims; provided expert witness testimony as required.

In 1991 Greenwood was assigned as the Commander of Section 18 & 19 in Salt Lake City. Under Utah state statute, § 53-1-113, he was responsible for the day-by-day operation of the troopers assigned to provide all necessary security and protection for the governor and the governor’s immediate family. Duties were also, but not limited to, providing all the driving and transportation for the Governor; provide security for the Utah Court of Appeals, Utah Supreme Court, and State facilities; provide security for the Governor’s residence during any activity; advance any outside events before the Governor’s arrival; respond to any threatening letters, investigate or doing any intelligence work as needed; and to try to keep the Governor on time during his schedule.

In 1993 Greenwood was promoted to Superintendent of the Utah Highway Patrol. As Superintendent he established policy and directed overall operation of the Utah Highway Patrol; divides the state into divisions and districts for the purpose of patrolling and policing the state. He determined budget requirements; establishes standards and prerequisites for training; was subject to and carried out provisions of the Highway Patrol policy and procedures.

== Political career ==
Greenwood was appointed to the Legislature in 2007. In 2012, Greenwood was unopposed in the Republican Primary and won his General Election nomination with a 72.1% majority.

During the 2013 and 2014 legislative sessions, Greenwood served on the Administrative Rules Review Committee, the Executive Offices and Criminal Justice Appropriations Subcommittee, the House Economic Development and Workforce Services Committee, and the House Law Enforcement and Criminal Justice Committee. During the interim, Greenwood served on the Law Enforcement and Criminal Justice Interim Committee, as well as the Political Subdivisions Interim Committee.

On April 2, 2014, Greenwood announced that he would not be seeking reelection.

== 2014 sponsored legislation ==
Bill number	Bill name	Bill status
HB0050	Involuntary Feeding and Hydration of Inmates Amendments	Governor Signed - 3/29/2014
HB0100	Illegal Immigration and Human Trafficking Enforcement	House/ filed - 3/13/2014
HB0147	Peace Officer Agreements with Federal Agencies	Governor Signed - 3/31/2014
HB0270	Peace Officer Certificates	Governor Signed - 3/31/2014
HB0295	Weapons Law Exemptions	Governor Signed - 3/31/2014
HB0296	Concealed Weapon Permit Exemptions Amendments	Governor Signed - 3/29/2014
HB0304	Law Enforcement Volunteer Amendments	Governor Signed - 3/29/2014
HB0345	Vending Services Operated by Blind Persons	House/ filed - 3/13/2014
HB0362	Pharmacy License Exemption for Animal Control Functions	House/ filed - 3/13/2014
HB0372	Law Enforcement Notification Amendments	House/ filed - 3/13/2014
HB0385	Expert Testimony Notice Requirement Amendments	House/ filed - 3/13/2014
HJR017	Joint Resolution on Jail Facilities	House/ to Lieutenant Governor - 3/18/2014

Greenwood also floor sponsored SB0120S03 Shelter Animal Vaccine Amendments and SB0144 Driver License Modifications.
