= Sheldon Killpack =

American politician

Sheldon L. Killpack

Member of the Utah Senate from the 21st district
- In office 2003–2010
- Preceded by: David Steele
- Succeeded by: Jerry Stevenson

Personal details
- Born: May 24, 1968 (age 58)
- Party: Republican
- Spouse: Nicole
- Education: Weber State University
- Occupation: Vice President, Academica West

Sheldon Killpack (born May 24, 1968) is an American politician from Utah. A member of the Republican Party, he was formerly the senate majority leader of the Utah State Senate, where he represented the state's 21st senate district in Syracuse.

He was elected as Majority Leader in the Utah Senate on November 7, 2008.

On January 16, 2010, Killpack resigned from the Utah Senate after being arrested on suspicion of drunk driving. While he refused a breath test for blood-alcohol level, a blood test showed a blood-alcohol level of 0.11, above the legal driving limit of 0.08. After fighting the charge for nearly a year, he pleaded guilty to Class B Misdemeanor driving under the influence.

Killpack was sentenced to 180 days in jail, the sentence was suspended, and he was required to perform 48 hours of community service, pay $1,350 in fines, take a class for DUI offenders and attend a victim-impact panel.

He is married to Nicole Killpack and is the father of four children.

Sheldon Killpack currently works for Academica West as vice president.

Killpack has a bachelor's degree from Weber State University.

Killpack is a member of the Church of Jesus Christ of Latter-day Saints (commonly referred to as Mormons).
