= Brad Dee =

American politician (born 1950)

Brad L. Dee

Member of the Utah House of Representatives from the 11th district
- In office January 2003 – January 2017

Personal details
- Born: May 5, 1950 (age 76)
- Party: Republican
- Spouse: Marsha
- Children: 5
- Education: Weber State University (BA); University of Phoenix (MA)
- Occupation: Human resource director

Bradley L. Dee (born May 5, 1950) is an American politician from Utah. He was a Republican member of the Utah State House, representing the state's 11th house district in Ogden from January 2003 through January 2017. He retired from office after choosing not to seek re-election in 2016.

== Early life and career ==
Dee holds a B.A. in public relations from Weber State University and an M.A. in human resources from the University of Phoenix. Dee is a Latter-day Saint. He has previously served as a bishop in the LDS Church. He currently works as human resources director for Weber County, Utah and lives in Washington Terrace, Utah with his wife Marsha and five children.

== Political career ==
Dee was first elected to the Utah House of Representatives in 2002 and began serving on January 1, 2003. He previously served as mayor of Washington Terrace, UT and as a member of its city council.

During the 2016 legislative session, Dee served as the House Vice-chair of the Executive Appropriations Committee, on the House Public Utilities, Energy, and Technology Committee, and the House Transportation Committee.

== 2016 sponsored legislation ==
Bill number	Bill title	Status
HB0008S01	State Agency Fees and Internal Service Fund Rate Authorization and Appropriations	House/ to Governor - 3/17/2016
HB0154	County Personal Requirements	Governor Signed - 3/20/2016
HB165	Garnishment Amendments	Governor Signed - 3/25/2016
HB0245	Local Health Department Amendments	Governor Signed - 3/21/2016
HB0348S02	Mountainous Planning District Amendments	House/ to Governor - 3/17/2016
HB0380S03	Utah Communications Authority Amendments	Governor Signed - 3/21/2016
HB0401	Public Safety Amendments	House/ filed - 3/10/2016
HB0457	Water Quality Revisions	House/ filed - 3/10/2016
HJR018	House Joint Resolution—Congressional Term Limits	House/ filed - 3/10/2016

Dee passed six of his nine introduced during the 2016 Legislative Session, giving him a 66.7% passage rate. He also floor sponsored four bills.

== Elections ==
- 2014: Dee faced Democrat Amy Steed Morgan in the general election, winning with 4,364 votes (62.6%) to Morgan's 2,607 votes (37.4%).
- 2012: Dee faced Democrat Pamela Udy in the general election, winning with 9,266 votes (68.1%) to Udy's 4,332 votes (31.9%).
- 2010: Dee faced Democrat Steven Gaskill in the general election, winning with 4,288 votes (69.5%) to Gaskell's 1,883 votes (30.5%).
