= Scott K. Jenkins =

American politician

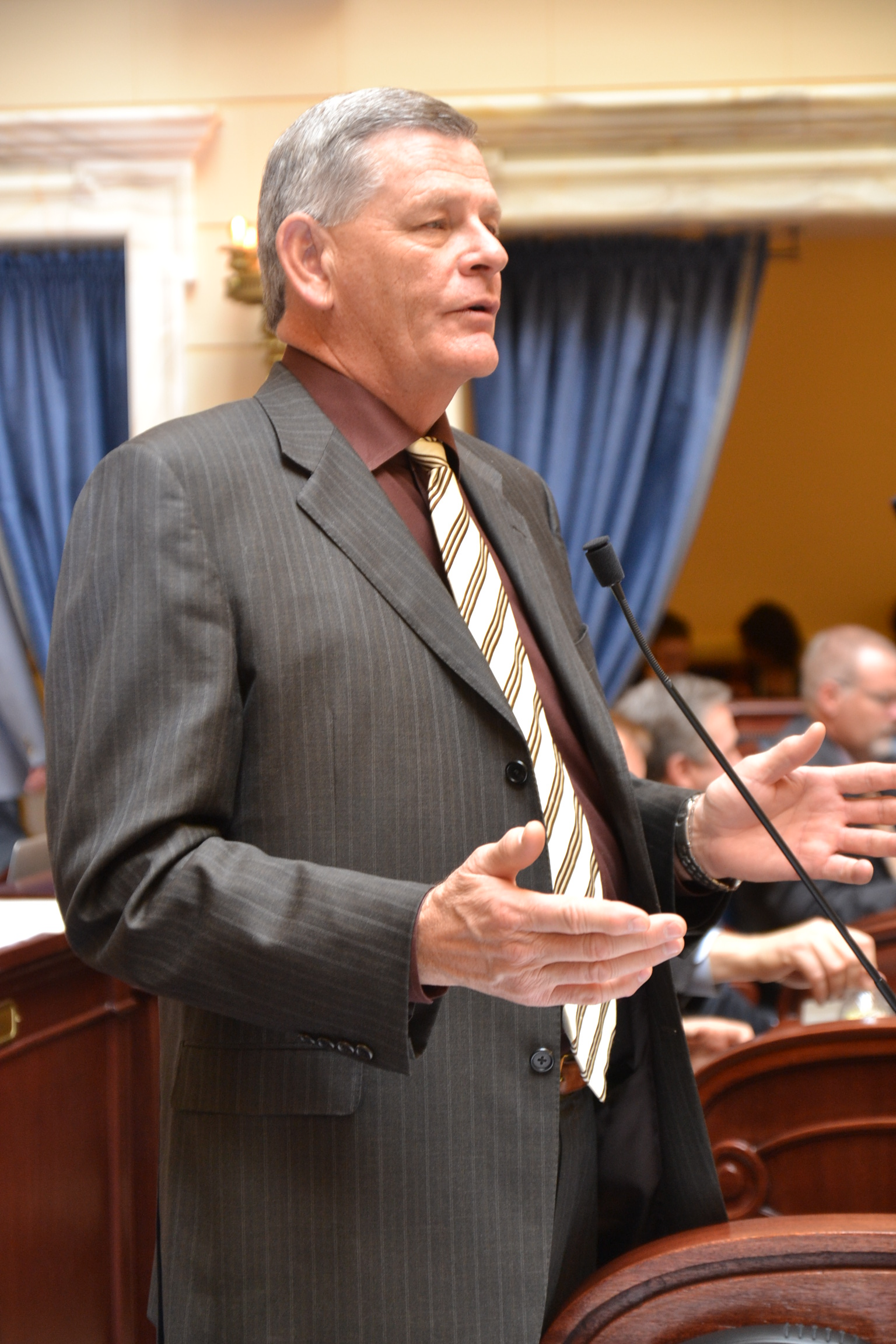
- Senator Scott Jenkins in 2014

Member of the Utah Senate from the 20th district
- In office January 15, 2001 – January 1, 2017
- Preceded by: Joseph L. Hull
- Succeeded by: D. Gregg Buxton

Personal details
- Born: Ogden, Utah
- Party: Republican Party
- Spouse: Becky
- Occupation: Businessman, Owner of Great Western Supply
- Website: Legislative Website

Scott Jenkins is an American politician and businessman from Utah. A Republican, he is a member of the Utah State Senate, representing the state's 20th senate district covering parts of Weber and Davis counties. He retired from his position as Senator and did not run for reelection in 2016. Jenkins has an associate degree from Weber State University.

== Personal life and education ==
Jenkins has lived in Utah all his life. He was raised about 100 feet from where he lives now. Jenkins went to Weber High School and earned his A.S. from Weber State College. He is married to his wife, Rebecca, and they have five children: Jennifer, Erick, Jolene, Irene, and Austin.

== Background ==
- Did Judiciary, Law Enforcement, and Criminal Justice Confirmation Committee as chair of the Plain City Planning Commission
- Plain City Council
- Plain City Mayor
- Weber Area Council of Governments
- Bona Vista Water District (Chair and Board of Directors)
- Weber County Boundary Commission (Chair)

== Political career ==
Jenkins was elected to be a Senator in 2000. He served as the Majority Leader from 2009 to 2012. Before his time in the Senate, Jenkins was Mayor of Plain City, Utah, and a Member of the Plain City Council, Utah, 1979–1987.

Jenkins has been a member of the following committees:

- Business, Economic Development, and Labor Appropriations Subcommittee
- Infrastructure and General Government Appropriations Subcommittee
- Senate Natural Resources, Agriculture, and Environment Committee (Chair)
- Senate Revenue and Taxation Committee
- Senate Judicial Confirmation Committee (Chair)
- Senate Natural Resources, Agriculture, and Environment Confirmation Committee
- State Water Development Commission

In 2016, Jenkins served on the following committees:

- Executive Offices and Criminal Justice Appropriations Subcommittee
- Natural Resources, Agriculture, and Environmental Quality Appropriations Subcommittee
- Senate Natural Resources, Agriculture, and Environment Committee (Chair)

=== Election results ===
Jenkins last ran for office in 2012, he ran unopposed.

Utah State Senate election Dis. 20, 2008
Party	Candidate	Votes	%	±%
Republican	Scott Jenkins	18,476	63.5	
Democratic	Steve Olsen	10,628	36.5	

Utah State Senate election Dis. 20, 2004
Party	Candidate	Votes	%	±%
Republican	Scott Jenkins	15,982	57.6	
Democratic	Joe Hull	11,784	42.4	

== Legislation ==
=== 2016 sponsored legislation ===
Bill number	Bill title	Bill status
S.B. 13	State Facility Energy Efficiency Fund Amendments	Governor signed March 28, 2016
S.B. 28	Water System Conservation Pricing	Governor signed March 25, 2016
S.B. 92	Municipal Landscape Amendments	Senate/Filed for bills not passed 2/25/2016
S.B. 184	Procurement Code Modifications	Governor signed 2/24/2016
S.C.R. 1	Concurrent Resolution Encouraging Universal Metering of Water Systems	Governor signed 3/29/2014

Senator Jenkins was also the floor sponsor for the following bills:

- H.B. 20 Lead Acid Battery Disposal Sunset Reauthorization
- H.B. 69 Qualified Political Party Amendments
- H.B. 138 Consumer Electronic Device Recycling Report Amendments
- H.B. 191 Interlock Restricted Driver Amendments
- H.B. 250 Air Quality Amendments
- H.B. 269 Recycling of Copper Wire
- H.B. 429 Specie Legal Tender Amendments
- HCR 11 Concurrent Resolution Encouraging the Repayment of Funds Used to Keep National Parks, Monuments, and Recreation Areas Open

== Political positions ==
=== Other ===
In February 2012, Jenkins made headlines in Utah for voting to deny tax breaks for military veterans, arguing the military already enjoys too many perks.
