= Melvin R. Brown =

American politician (1938–2026)

Member of the Utah House of Representatives from the 53rd district
- In office January 1, 2007 – January 1, 2017
- Succeeded by: Logan Wilde

Personal details
- Born: February 15, 1938 Henefer, Utah, U.S.
- Died: July 17, 2026 (aged 88)
- Party: Republican
- Education: Utah State University

Melvin Richins Brown (February 15, 1938 – July 17, 2026) was an American politician who was a Republican member of the Utah State House of Representatives. He lived in Coalville, Utah, and represented House District 53.

== Background ==
Melvin Richins Brown was born in Henefer, Utah on February 15, 1938. His parents are Esther Richins and Leonard Brown. He along with Eddie Jensen were the first North Summit Braves to make football First Team All state. Brown was the Center of the 1955 North Summit Football Team. Along with the 1955 team were Wayne Wright and Roy Richins. Brown held a bachelor's degree in education from Utah State University and did graduate work in educational psychology at the University of Utah. He listed his profession as farmer and consultant. He lived in Coalville, Utah and was the father of four children.

Brown died on July 17, 2026, at the age of 88.

== Political career ==
Brown was first elected to the State House in 1986 and served through 2000. He was then re-elected in 2006. From 1993 to 1994 he was the House Assistant Majority Whip and from 1995 to 1998 he was the Speaker of the House.

- 2012 Brown defeated John Zimmerman in the Republican convention and was then unchallenged in the general election on November 6, 2012.
- 2014 Brown defeated Blaine Hone and John Zimmerman in the 2014 Republican convention. He then went on to win the general election on November 4, 2014, with 7,304 votes (67.5%) defeating democratic candidate Ray L. Worthen.

During the 2016 legislative session, Brown served on the Social Services Appropriations Subcommittee, the House Health and Human Services Committee, House Natural Resources, Agriculture, and Environment Committee and the Rural Development Legislative Liaison Committee. He left office in 2017 after losing a 2016 primary election by 9 votes to Logan Wilde.

== 2016 sponsored legislation ==
Bill number	Bill title	Status
HB0248	Municipal Disconnection Amendments	Governor Signed – March 30, 2016
HB0360S02	Land Use Amendments	House/ filed – October 3, 2016

Brown also floor sponsored SB0109S01 School and Institutional Trust Lands Amendments, and SJR012 Proposal to Amend Utah Constitution -- Changes to School Funds.
