= Howard A. Stephenson =

American politician from Utah

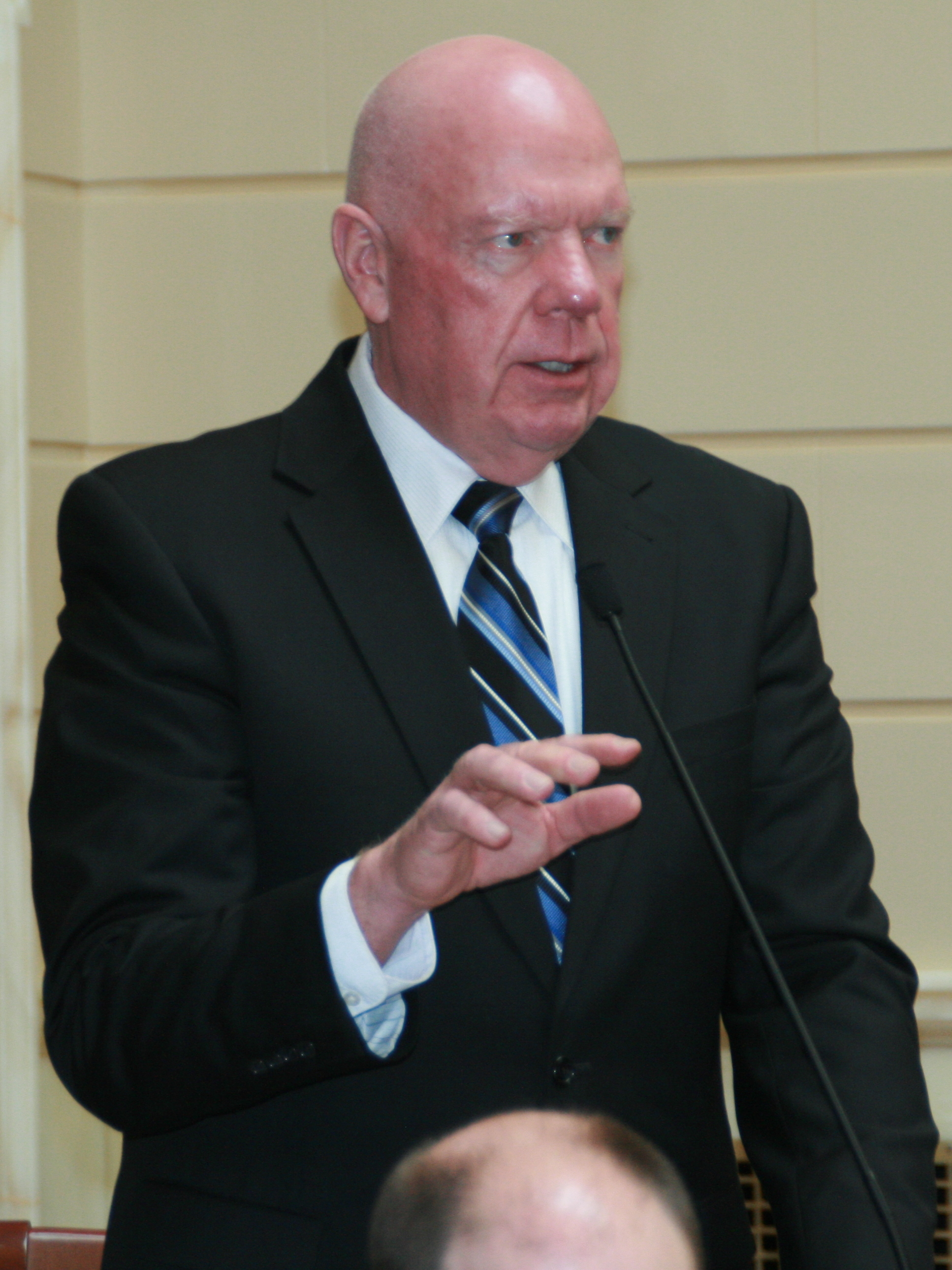
- Stephenson in February 2013

Member of the Utah Senate from the 11th district
- In office 1992–2018
- Succeeded by: Dan McCay

Personal details
- Born: November 7, 1950 (age 75)
- Party: Republican
- Spouse: Julie
- Occupation: Public Administrator

Howard A. Stephenson (born November 7, 1950) is a Utah politician who represented the State's 11th senate district in Salt Lake County including Draper from 1992 through 2018.

== Personal life, education, and career ==
Stephenson received a B.S. degree in psychology and aerospace studies from Brigham Young University, and a Master of Public Administration (1977), also from Brigham Young University. Since then, he has worked as a taxpayer advocate, and from 1988 to 2021 he served as president of the Utah Taxpayers Association. He currently consults and speaks nationally on digital teaching and learning, advocating for personalized teaching and learning and K-12 dual language immersion. Stephenson is a member of the Church of Jesus Christ of Latter-day Saints (LDS).

== Notable quotes ==
Regarding Utah teachers using technology in the classroom, "...are we going to have to wait like Moses did...wandering 40 years in the wilderness for the old ones to die off before we can really embrace this with fidelity?"

Regarding college and university degrees which don't produce jobs suitable for the recipient, "...degrees to nowhere."

Regarding his announcement of retirement from the state senate, "I’ve never experienced air being sucked out of a room before."

== Political career ==
As a Utah state senator, Stephenson is well-positioned to influence Utah legislation relating to education and to state revenues. As a state senator, Stephenson has won the following awards:

- Utah Republican Hispanic Assembly Recognition
- Utah Council for Exceptional Children Legislator of the Year
- Utah Association for Gifted Children Community Service Award
- Coalition for People with Disabilities 1995, 1998, 2001, 2002 "Hero on the Hill" Award
- Alpine School District Children's Behavioral Therapy Unit Autism Preschool Recognition
- Education Leadership Coalition Recognition
- Utah Valley Autism Preschool Recognition
- Utah Food Industry Association 2001, 2004 Outstanding Legislative Service Award
- Utah Farm Bureau Federation Friend of Agriculture Award
- Utah Information Technology Association Recognition
- National Federation of Independent Business Guardian of Small Business Award
- Utah Taxpayers Association Friend of the Taxpayer Award
- Utah Restaurant Association Legislator of the Year, 2003, 2004
- Utah Health Insurance Association Legislator of the Year
- Utah Correctional Industries Award
- Sandy City Outstanding Elected Official
- Grassroots Distinguished Service Award
- Utah Association of Realtors Distinguished Service Award

During his 26 years in the Utah Senate, Stephenson served on the following committees:

- Higher Education Appropriations Subcommittee
- Health & Human Services Appropriations Subcommittee (Senate Chair)
- Public Education Appropriations Subcommittee (Senate Chair)
- Senate Education Committee (Chair)
- Senate Revenue and Taxation Committee (Chair)
- Administrative Rules Review Committee (Senate Chair)

=== Election ===
==== 2014 ====
2014 Utah State Senate election District 11
Party	Candidate	Votes	%
Republican	Howard Stephenson	13,195	63.1%
Democratic	Michele Weeks	7,713	36.9%

== Legislation ==
=== 2016 sponsored bills ===
Bill number	Bill title	Bill status
S.B. 38	School Funding Amendments	Governor Signed 3/23/2016
S.B. 87	Administrative Rulemaking Act Modifications	Governor Signed 3/17/2016
S.B. 88	Administrative Rules Reauthorization	Governor Signed 3/29/2016
S.B. 93	Computer Science Initiative For Public Schools	Governor Signed 3/28/2016
S.B. 112	Property Tax Assessment Amount Amendments	Governor Signed 3/29/2016
S.B. 120	Property Tax Notice Amendments	Governor Signed 3/28/2016
S.B. 139	Board of Education Approval Amendments	Governor Signed 3/23/2016
S.B. 143	Competency Based Learning Amendments	Governor Signed 3/28/2016
S.B. 152	Accelerated Foreign Language Course Amendments	Governor Signed 3/18/2016
S.B. 163	Kindergarten Amendments	Senate/Filed for bills not passed 3/10/2016
S.B. 165	Public Education Appointment and Hiring	Senate/Filed for bills not passed 3/10/2016
S.B. 176	Office of the State Board of Education Amendments	Senate/Filed for bills not passed 3/10/2016
S.B. 204	Free Market Protection and Privatization Board Act Amendments	Governor Signed 3/22/2016
S.B. 211	Private Use of Drones	Senate/Filed for bills not passed 3/10/2016
S.B. 224	Student Assessments	Senate/Filed for bills not passed 3/10/2016
S.B. 228	Multicounty Assessing and Collecting Levy Amendments	Governor Signed 3/25/2016
S.B. 237	Immigration and Alien Related Amendments	Governor Signed 3/18/2016
S.B. 239	School Governance Amendments	Governor Signed 3/28/2016

=== Notable legislation ===
Stephenson is a proponent of year-round schools. He believes that moving public schools to a trimester schedule will save money. On his campaign website, he states that he supports "tuition tax credits or vouchers."

He has proposed a bill which would require surety bonds for guest workers, to "ensure that . . . the people who are here have no criminal background, are disease free, and are paying their own cost of policing."
