= Mark Wheatley (politician) =

American politician

Member of the Utah House of Representatives from the 35th district
- In office January 1, 2005 – December 31, 2024
- Preceded by: Judy Ann Buffmire
- Succeeded by: Rosalba Dominguez

Personal details
- Party: Democratic Party
- Spouse: Josie Valdez
- Education: Westminster College
- Occupation: Education administrator

Mark Archuleta Wheatley is a former Democratic member of the Utah State House of Representatives, representing the 35th District from 2005 to 2024. He lives in Murray, Utah, with his wife Josie.

== Education ==
He earned a bachelor's degree from Westminster College in Salt Lake City.

== Political career ==
Wheatley was first elected on November 2, 2004.

In 2012, Wheatley challenged his wife, Josie Valdez, to run for the State Senate in 2012 after the incumbent senator retired. Were she to win the race, it would have been the first time in Utah history that a husband and wife would serve together in the legislature. However, Valdez lost to Republican Brian Shiozawa 56.8% to 43.2%.

During the 2016 general session, he served on the Business, Economic Development, and Labor Appropriations Subcommittee, the Higher Education Appropriations Subcommittee, the House Economic Development and Workforce Services Committee and the House Judiciary Committee. In the 2022 general session, Wheatley served on the Administrative Rules Review Committee, the Higher Education Appropriations Subcommittee, the House Business and Labor Committee, the House Ethics Committee, and the House Judiciary Committee.

== Political Positions and Significant Legislation ==
In 2022, Rep. Wheatley sponsored a bill "that would have required that vehicles pass a muffler inspection as a prerequisite for registration." The bill failed to pass on the House floor by a 35–39 vote.

In 2018, Rep. Wheatley sponsored a bill that would prevent the Attorney General and other high-level elected officials in Utah from campaign fundraising during the legislative session. In defending his bill, Wheatley said that "We don't want the Capitol to be a place where people come up and raise funds, especially when we're in session and doing the people's work." The bill passed unanimously in the Legislature and was signed by the Governor into law.

In 2017, Rep. Wheatley sponsored a bill that "would allow employees with discrimination claims to seek civil lawsuits and action through the state court system, and not rely solely on the Utah Antidiscrimination and Labor Division." The bill was held in committee unanimously.

In 2018, Rep. Wheatley wrote an opinion editorial praising Rep. Rob Bishop for supporting reauthorization of the Land and Water Conservation Fund, saying that "the only 'special interest' the Land and Water Conservation Fund serves is that of everyday Utahns."

== Elections ==
- 2014 Wheatley was unopposed in the Democratic convention and won the general election against Republican Eileen Lentz and Libertarian Chelsea Travis with 3,202 votes (63.7%).
- 2012 Wheatley was unopposed in the Democratic convention and won the general election against Republican Casey Fitts and Libertarian Chelsea Travis with 4,780 votes (53.8%).
- 2010 Wheatley faced Rob Alexander again, winning re-election with 2,553 votes (53.1%).
- 2008 Wheatley faced Republican nominee Rob Alexander in the general election, winning re-election with 4,670 votes (63.1%).

== 2016 sponsored legislation ==
Bill Number	Bill Title	Status
HB0378	Labor Compliance Protection Amendments	House/ filed - 3/10/2016
HB0449	Inmate Education Amendments	House/ filed - 3/10/2016
HCR007	Concurrent Resolution for a Statue to Recognize Father Dominguez and Father Escalante	Governor Signed - 3/14/2016

Wheatley passed one of the three bills he introduced, giving him a 33.3% passage rate. He did not floor sponsor any legislation during 2016.

== Personal life ==
Unlike the majority of the Utah legislature, who are members of the Church of Jesus Christ of Latter-day Saints, Wheatley is a Roman Catholic. His wife, Josie Valdez, was the 2008 Utah Democratic lieutenant gubernatorial nominee, and she also served as the vice chair of the Utah Democratic Party from 2012 until 2015.
