= John L. Valentine =

American politician

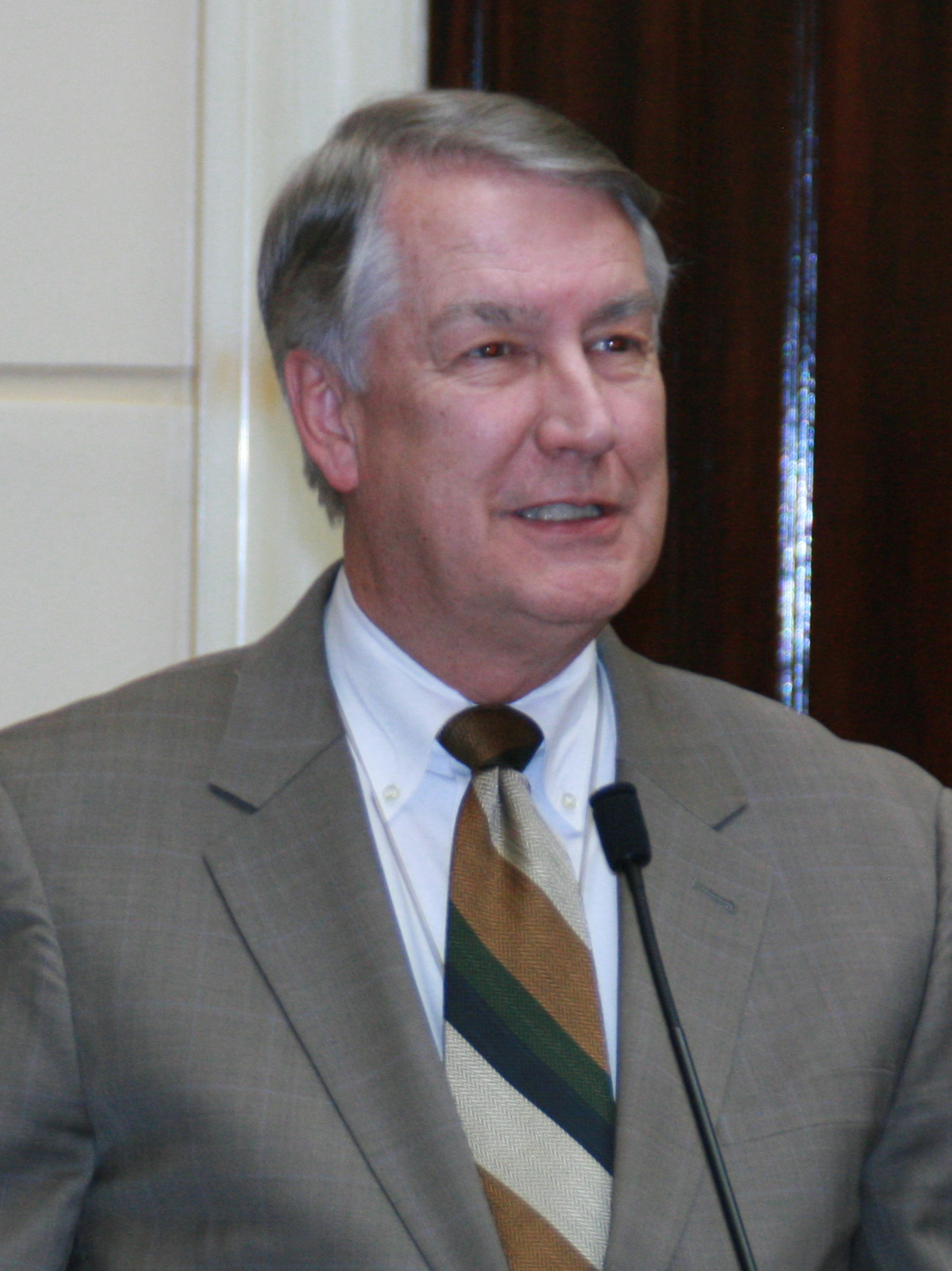
- John Valentine

Member of the Utah Senate from the 14th district
- In office January 1, 1999 – September 2014 (appointed to Utah Tax Commission)
- Preceded by: Craig A. Peterson
- Succeeded by: Alvin B. Jackson

Personal details
- Born: Fullerton, California, U.S.
- Party: Republican
- Spouse: Karen
- Occupation: Attorney
- Website: Legislative website

John Valentine is a former member of the Utah State Senate, who represented Utah's 14th Senate District from 1999 to 2014. Prior to being appointed to the Utah Senate he served in the Utah House of Representatives representing Utah's 58th House District from 1988 to 1992 and Utah's 59th House District from 1992 to 1998. Valentine served as the Utah Senate President from 2005 to 2008. On August 4, 2014, Valentine was appointed by Governor Gary R. Herbert to serve as Chair of the Utah State Tax Commission.

== Early life, education and career ==
John Valentine was born in Fullerton, California and graduated from Savanna High School, in Anaheim, California. He obtained a B.S. in Accounting and Economics from Brigham Young University (BYU) in 1973 and a J.D. from Brigham Young University's J. Reuben Clark School of Law in 1976. Upon graduating, Valentine joined the law firm Howard, Lewis & Petersen based in Provo, UT where he is now a managing partner. Valentine specializes in federal and estate taxation, estate planning, contract, and business law. Valentine has received an "AV" rating in Martindale-Hubble and is a Fellow in the American College of Trusts and Estate Counsel. Valentine was also awarded the Tax Practitioner of the Year award by the Utah State Bar in 2008. John has also served as an adjunct professor of law at Brigham Young University and is a certified mediator with Utah Dispute Resolution. Valentine is also certified as an Emergency Medical Technician (EMT) and has been an active volunteer member of the Utah County Search and Rescue Team for over 25 years. As a lieutenant in the Search and Rescue Team, Valentine has participated in countless mountain, cave, and wilderness rescues.

Senator Valentine is also a CPA California Emergency Medical Technician, Utah State Bar Examiner, National Association Search and Rescue (NASAR) Instructor, Utah Bar Association member, member of the Tax Section and Tax Specialization Committee, member of the American Bar Association (tax section), executive board member of the Utah National Parks Council, Fellow in the American College for Trust and Estate Counsel, and a member of the NCSL Assembly on Fiscal Affairs and Oversight.

Valentine is married to his wife, Karen and they have 6 children together. Valentine is a member of the Church of Jesus Christ of Latter-day Saints.

== Political career ==
John Valentine ran for the Utah House of Representatives for Utah's 59th House District in 1988 against Democrat Berdean Jarman. He won re-election in 1990, and in 1992 ran successfully for Utah's 58th House District. In 1998, Senator Valentine was appointed to the Utah State Senate in 1998 to replace Republican Senator Craig A. Peterson, representing the Utah's 14th Senate District. Senator Valentine has held a variety of leadership position in the Senate including Senate Majority Whip in 2001 and Senate President from 2005 to 2008.

In 2014, Senator Valentine served as the Senate Rules Committee Chairman. He also sat on the Higher Education Appropriations Subcommittee Natural Resources, Agriculture, and Environmental Quality Appropriations Subcommittee, the Standing Senate Business and Labor Committee, and the Standing Senate Revenue and Taxation Committee.

== 2014 Sponsored Legislation ==
Bill number	Bill title	Bill status
S.B. 27	Reauthorization of Massage Therapy Licensure Act	Governor Signed 3/29/2014
S.B. 49	Parental Permission to Release Student Information	Senate/filed 3/13/2014
S.B. 60	Fuel Excise Tax Amendments	Senate/filed 3/13/2014
S.B. 123	Interlocal Cooperation Act Revisions	Governor Signed 3/31/2014
S.B. 133	Benefit Corporation Amendments	Governor Signed 4/1/2014
S.B. 134	Taxation Related Referendum Amendments	Governor Signed 4/1/2014
S.B. 144	Driver License Modifications	Governor Signed 3/28/2014
S.B. 160	Workers' Compensation Amendments	Governor Signed 3/27/2014
S.B. 190	Utility Fee Limitations	Senate/filed 3/13/2014
S.B. 191	Verification of Legal Status Amendments	Senate/filed 2/26/2014
S.B. 226	Professional Licensing Amendments	Governor Signed 4/1/2014
S.B. 233 S002	Economic Development and the Utah Small Business Jobs Act	Governor Signed 4/2/2014
S.B. 261	Emergency Room Services Amendments	Senate/filed 3/13/2014
S.J.R. 7	Joint Resolution Regarding Qualifications of State Tax Commission Members	Enrolled 3/19/2014
S.J.R. 11	Joint Rules Resolution on Bill Numbering	Enrolled 2/27/2014
S.J.R. 13	Joint Rules Resolution Modifying Eligibility Requirements for Independent Legislative Ethics Commission Members	Enrolled 3/12/2014
S.R. 1	Senate Rules Resolution on Committee Hearings	Senate Enrolled 1/28/2014

Valentine also Floor sponsored the following bills:

- HB0053 Restitution Amendments
- HB0117S02 Patent Infringement Amendments
- HB0118S01 Personal Injury Damages Amendments
- HB0126 Retirement Amendments
- HB0201S02 Visitation Amendments
- HB0218 Tax Credit for Working Individuals and Families
- HB0251S01 Unsworn Declaration Amendments
- HB0253S01 State Fair Corporation Board Amendments
- HB0277 Music Therapist Licensure Amendments
- HB0287 Arbitration for Dog Bites Amendments
- HB0293S01 Government Immunity Wildlife Waiver Amendments
- HB0301 Concealed Weapon Permit for Servicemembers
- HB0302S02 Voting Records Amendments
- HB0325 Judicial Performance Evaluation Commission Amendments
- HB0331S01 Identification Card Amendments
- HB0336S01 Court System Task Force
- HB0376 Alcohol Revisions
- HB0394S02 Campaign Finance Revisions
- HB0401S02 Utah Medicaid Program
- HB0414S01 Legislative Subpoena Amendments
- HCR004 Concurrent Resolution Recognizing the 20th Anniversary of the School and Institutional Trust Lands Administration
- HJR007S01 Joint Rules Resolution on Legislative Review Notes
- HJR023 Joint Resolution Endorsing Tier III Standards for Air Quality
