= Utah's 19th State Senate district =

American legislative district

The 19th Utah State Senate District is located in Salt Lake and Utah, Counties and includes Utah House Districts 41, 42, 43, 45, 46, and 54. The current State Senator representing the 19th district is Kirk Cullimore Jr. was elected to the Utah Senate in 2018 and is up for re-election in 2026.

== Previous Utah State Senators (District 19) ==
Name	Party	Term
Kirk Cullimore Jr	Republican	2018 -
David L. Gladwell	Republican	2001-2004
Robert F. Montgomery	Republican	1993-2001
Boyd K. Storey	Republican	1989-1992
Darrell G. Renstrom	Democratic	1985-1988
Bryce C. Flamm	Republican	1981-1984
Darrell G. Renstrom	Democratic	1973-1980
Haven J. Barlow	Republican	1967-1972

== Election results ==
=== General Election ===
Utah State Senate election, 2004
Party	Candidate	Votes	%	±%
Republican	Allen M. Christensen	19,540	62.3	
Democratic	Jim Hasenyager	11,844	37.7	

Utah State Senate election, 2008
Party	Candidate	Votes	%	±%
Republican	Allen M. Christensen	20,639	62.92	
Democratic	Bill R. Hansen	12,164	37.08	

== Current Candidates ==
Note: See footnote for candidate listing guidelines.

District	Party	Incumbent	Status	Party	Candidate	Votes	%	Change
19	Republican	Kirk Cullimore Jr.		Democratic	Shana Anderson			

== See also ==
- Shana Anderson
- Allen M. Christensen
- Utah Democratic Party
- Utah Libertarian Party
- Utah Republican Party
- Utah Senate
