= Utah's 20th State Senate district =

American legislative district

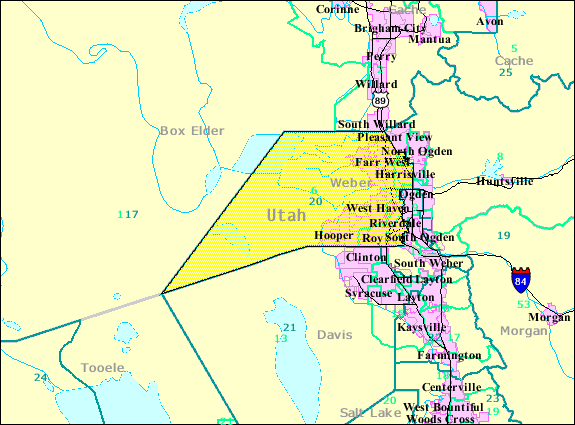
Map of the 20th Utah Senate District.

The 20th Utah Senate District is located in Weber County and includes Utah House Districts 6, 7, 8, 9, 11 and 12. The current State Senator representing the 20th district is Gregg Buxton. Buxton was elected to the Utah Senate in 2016 and re-elected in 2020.

== Previous Utah State Senators (District 20) ==
| Name | Party | Term |
|---|---|---|
| Scott K. Jenkins | Republican | 2001-2017 |
| Joseph L. Hull | Democratic | 1993–2001 |
| Glade Nielsen | Republican | 1987–1992 |
| Lowell S. Peterson | Republican | 1981–1986 |
| Kenneth Pace | Democratic | 1977–1980 |
| Merrill Jenkins | Democratic | 1973–1976 |
| Miles Cap Ferry | Republican | 1967–1972 |

== Election results ==
=== 2020 General Election ===
Utah State Senate election, 2020
| Party | Candidate | Votes | % | ±% |
|---|---|---|---|---|
| Republican | D. Gregg Buxton | 42,693 | 100.0 | +30.69% |

== See also ==
- Utah Democratic Party
- Utah Republican Party
- Utah Senate
