= Allen M. Christensen =

American politician from Utah

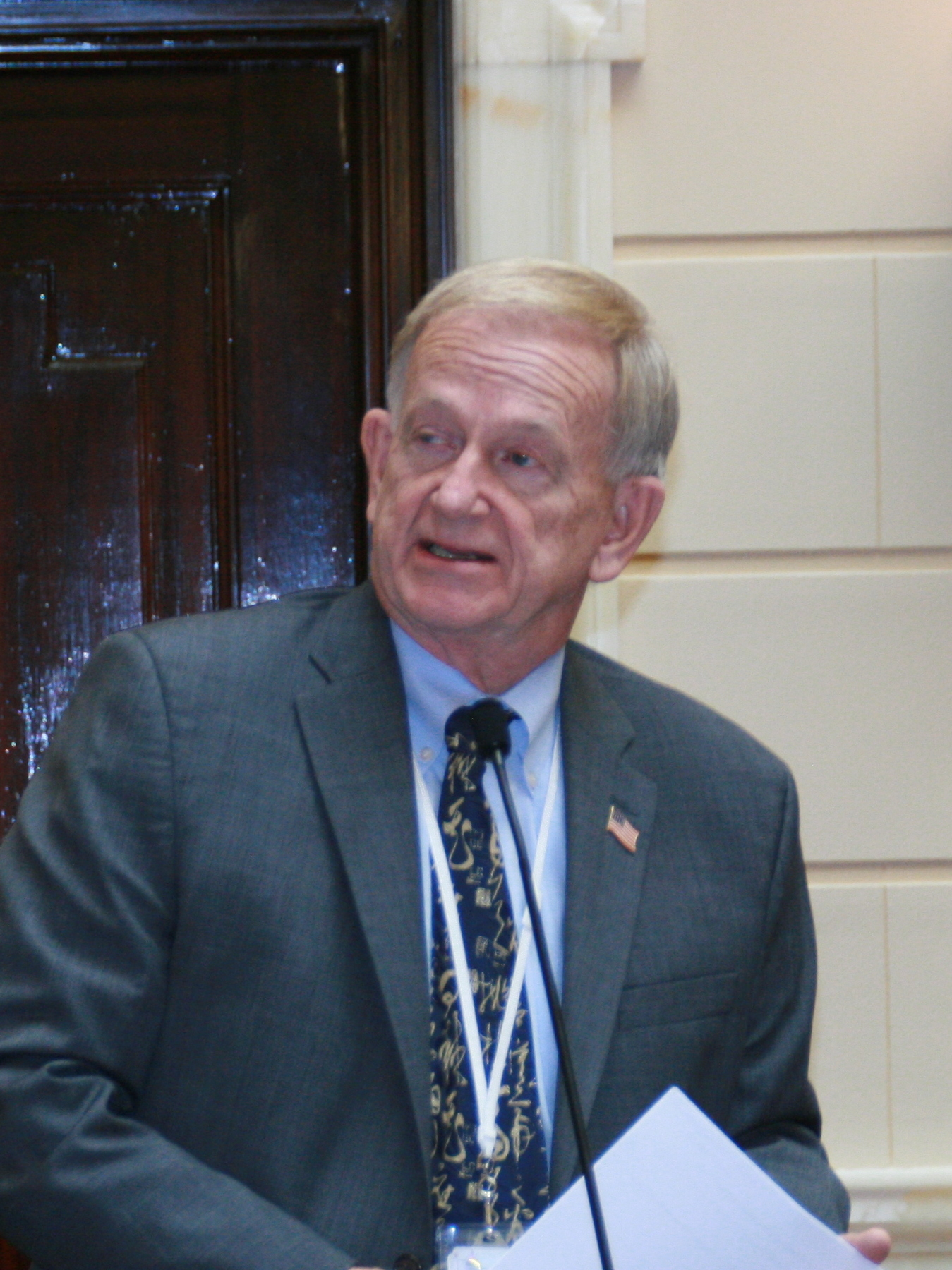

Member of the Utah Senate from the 19th district
- In office January 1, 2005 – January 1, 2021
- Preceded by: David L. Gladwell
- Succeeded by: John D. Johnson

Personal details
- Born: Ogden, Utah, U.S.
- Party: Republican
- Spouse: Janis
- Children: 6
- Occupation: Pediatric dentist
- Website: Legislative Website

Allen Christensen is an American politician who served as a member of the Utah State Senate from 2005 to 2021. Elected in November 2004, he representing the state's 19th senate district in Morgan, Summit and Weber Counties.

== Education ==
Christensen attended Brigham Young University, Utah State University and Weber State University. He received his DDS degree from the University of the Pacific. He then completed his dental residency at Primary Children’s Hospital and University of Oregon Health Sciences Center in 1978. He took two years off from his education to serve a Spanish-speaking LDS mission.

== Career ==
He has worked at his private dental practice in Ogden his entire career. He has also worked with the Commission on Aging, the Pandemic Flu Taskforce, and Baby Watch Oral Health.

=== Utah Senate ===
Christensen started his political career as a North Ogden City councilman, where he served for two four-year terms. He was elected to the Utah State Senate in 2004 and represented the 19th district.

In 2016, Christensen served on the following committees:

- Social Services Appropriations Subcommittee (Senate Chair)
- Senate Ethics Committee
- Senate Health and Human Services Committee
- Senate Natural Resources, Agriculture, and Environment Committee

== Personal life ==
Christensen married Janis Henrikson in Manti, Utah, in 1971. They have six children.

== Sources ==
- Project Vote Smart biography on Christensen
