= Michael G. Waddoups =

American politician and property manager

Michael G. Waddoups (born June 12, 1948) is a former American politician and property manager from Utah. A Republican, he served as a member of the Utah State Senate, representing the state's 6th senate district in Salt Lake County including Taylorsville.

== Biography ==
Waddoups was elected President of the senate for 2009–2010.

Waddoups was scrutinized for his outspoken opposition to Judge Robert Hilder during Hilder's confirmation hearings for the Utah State Court of Appeals. It has been reported in The Salt Lake Tribune that Waddoups was upset at Hilder for a 2003 ruling which allowed the University of Utah to prohibit firearms from its campus. It was also reported that Waddoups accused Hilder of ethics violations during the hearings. However, Hilder has never received an ethics violation during his career as a judge.

While defending controversial HB477, Waddoups stated, "nobody likes to do this in an election year, so now is the time," as well as "we want to do it today. It will complicate matters if it has a weekend to fester." These statements angered many constituents.

He is a member of the Church of Jesus Christ of Latter-day Saints.

== Electoral results ==
Utah State Senate election Dis. 6, 2008
Party	Candidate	Votes	%	±%
Republican	Michael G. Waddoups	17,187	57.2	
Democratic	Cora Lee Jckowski	12,869	42.8	

Utah State Senate election Dis. 6, 2004
Party	Candidate	Votes	%	±%
Republican	Michael G. Waddoups	16,543	57	
Democratic	Cora Lee Jckowski	11,574	40	
