= 2020 Utah House of Representatives election =

- November 3, 2020

All 75 seats in the Utah House of Representatives 38 seats needed for a majority
- Turnout: 67.9%
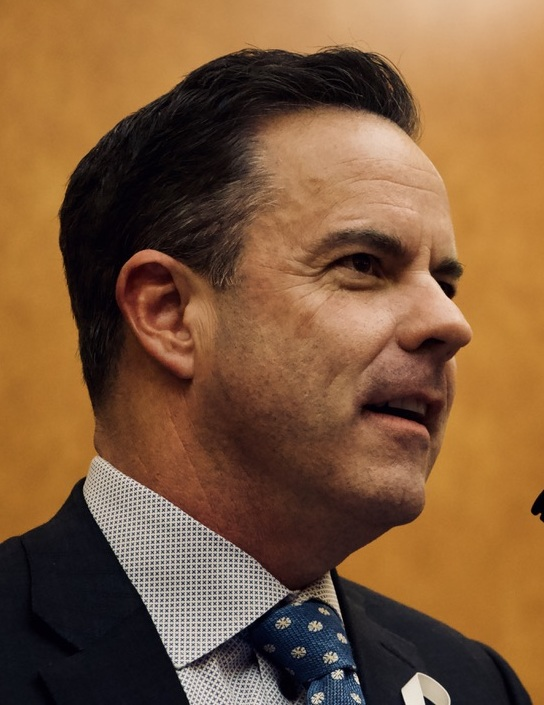

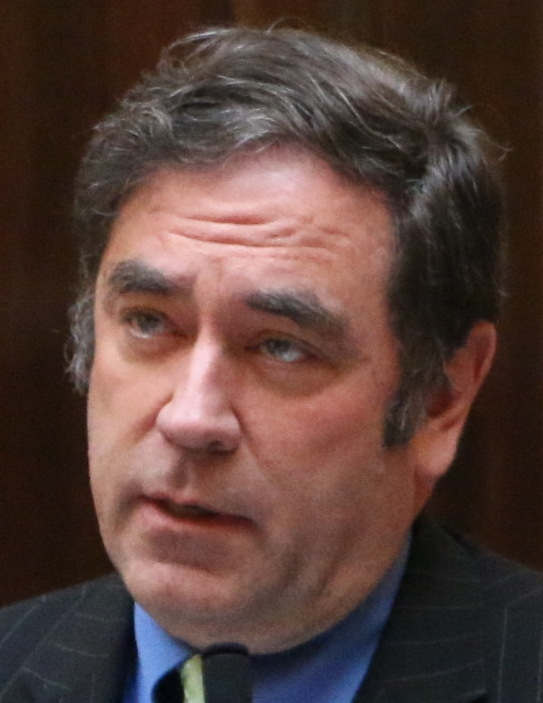
	Majority party	Minority party
Leader	Brad Wilson	Brian King
Party	Republican	Democratic
Leader since	January 28, 2019	January 26, 2015
Leader's seat	15–Kaysville	28–Salt Lake City
Last election	59 seats, 61.7%	16 seats, 34.1%
Seats before	59	16
Seats won	58	17
Seat change	▼1	▲1
Popular vote	700,140 (Note: Districts 2, 27, 55, 57, 62, 64–67, 69, 71, and 73 have no data, and are only contested by Republican candidates.)	389,899 (Note: Districts 24 and 26 have no data, and are only contested by Democratic candidates.)
Percentage	61.28%	34.13%
Swing	▼0.41%	▲0.07%
- Results: Democratic gain Republican hold Democratic hold
Speaker before election
Brad Wilson
Republican
Elected Speaker
Brad Wilson
Republican

The 2020 Utah House of Representatives election was held in the U.S. state of Utah on November 3, 2020 to elect members to the House of Representatives. Elections were held in 75 electoral districts to elect two-year term members to the 64th Utah State Legislature. Elections were also held throughout the state for U.S. president, the U.S. House, and for the Utah Senate.

Primary elections were held on June 30, 2020.

The Republican Party retained majority control of the House by a large margin, losing only one seat to the Democratic Party in the process. This election was the first time the Democrats won 17 seats since 2010.

== Predictions ==
Source	Ranking	As of
The Cook Political Report	Safe R	October 21, 2020

== Results ==
=== Overview ===
Party	Candidates	Votes		Seats				
Party	Candidates	No.	%	Before	Up	Won	After	+/–
Republican	73	918,220	66.08%	59	59	58	58	▼1
Democratic	54	418,843	30.14%	16	16	17	17	▲1
United Utah	18	38,765	2.79%	0	0	0	0	Steady
Constitution	6	10,403	0.75%	0	0	0	0	Steady
Libertarian	2	2,395	0.17%	0	0	0	0	Steady
Others	1	846	0.06%	0	0	0	0	Steady
Total		1,389,472	100.00%	75	75	75	75	Steady

Popular vote
Republican	66.08%
Democratic	30.14%
United Utah	2.79%
Constitution	0.75%
Libertarian	0.17%
Others	0.06%

House seats
Republican	77.33%
Democratic	22.67%

=== Close races ===
Districts where the margin of victory was under 10%:

1. District 45, 0.40%
2. District 39, 0.54%
3. District 33, 1.38%
4. District 22, 1.88%
5. District 10, 2.04%
6. District 38, 3.34% (gain)
7. District 49, 7.68%
8. District 54, 8.66%

=== District 1 ===
2020 Utah House of Representatives 1st district election
Party	Candidate	Votes	%
Republican	Joel Ferry (incumbent)	15,098	79.40%
Democratic	Amber Hardy	2,514	13.22%
Constitution	Sherry Phipps	1,402	7.37%
Total votes		19,014	100.00%

=== District 2 ===
2020 Utah House of Representatives 2nd district election
Party	Candidate	Votes	%
Republican	Jefferson Moss (incumbent)	27,428	100%
Total votes		27,428	100%

=== District 3 ===
Republican primary
Party	Candidate	Votes	%
Republican	Mike Petersen	4,635	55.78%
Republican	Val Potter (incumbent)	3,675	44.22%
Total votes		8,310	100.00%

2020 Utah House of Representatives 3rd district election
Party	Candidate	Votes	%
Republican	Mike Petersen	15,197	73.73%
Democratic	Holly Gunther	5,415	26.27%
Total votes		20,612	100.00%

=== District 4 ===
2020 Utah House of Representatives 4th district election
Party	Candidate	Votes	%
Republican	Dan Johnson (incumbent)	8,196	59.43%
Democratic	Mary DaSilva	5,595	40.57%
Total votes		13,791	100.00%

=== District 5 ===
2020 Utah House of Representatives 5th district election
Party	Candidate	Votes	%
Republican	Casey Snider (incumbent)	15,841	79.57%
Democratic	Lauren Abell	4,068	20.43%
Total votes		19,909	100.00%

=== District 6 ===
2020 Utah House of Representatives 6th district election
Party	Candidate	Votes	%
Republican	Cory Maloy (incumbent)	19,551	80.40%
United Utah	Christopher Rawlins	4,767	19.60%
Total votes		24,318	100.00%

=== District 7 ===
2020 Utah House of Representatives 7th district election
Party	Candidate	Votes	%
Republican	Ryan Wilcox	12,055	64.60%
Democratic	Grant Protzman	6,607	35.40%
Total votes		18,662	100.00%

=== District 8 ===
2020 Utah House of Representatives 8th district election
Party	Candidate	Votes	%
Republican	Steve Waldrip (incumbent)	10,067	56.98%
Democratic	Oscar Mata	7,600	43.02%
Total votes		17,667	100.00%

=== District 9 ===
2020 Utah House of Representatives 9th district election
Party	Candidate	Votes	%
Republican	Cal Musselman	8,426	58.41%
Democratic	Steve Olsen	5,999	41.59%
Total votes		14,425	100.00%

=== District 10 ===
2020 Utah House of Representatives 10th district election (Note: The Associated Press has not officially called this race for either candidate.)
Party	Candidate	Votes	%
Democratic	LaWanna Shurtliff (incumbent)	7,054	51.02%
Republican	Travis Campbell	6,771	48.98%
Total votes		13,825	100.00%

=== District 11 ===
2020 Utah House of Representatives 11th district election
Party	Candidate	Votes	%
Republican	Kelly Miles (incumbent)	10,996	60.30%
Democratic	Jason Allen	7,238	39.70%
Total votes		18,234	100.00%

=== District 12 ===
2020 Utah House of Representatives 12th district election
Party	Candidate	Votes	%
Republican	Mike Schultz (incumbent)	13,478	77.19%
United Utah	Shawn Ferriola	3,983	22.80%
Total votes		17,461	100.00%

=== District 13 ===
2020 Utah House of Representatives 13th district election
Party	Candidate	Votes	%
Republican	Paul Ray (incumbent)	10,798	63.15%
Democratic	Tab Uno	6,302	36.85%
Total votes		17,100	100.00%

=== District 14 ===
Republican primary
Party	Candidate	Votes	%
Republican	Karianne Lisonbee (incumbent)	2,842	60.87%
Republican	Jennifer Hogge	1,827	39.13%
Total votes		4,669	100.00%

2020 Utah House of Representatives 14th district election
Party	Candidate	Votes	%
Republican	Karianne Lisonbee (incumbent)	10,336	65.43%
Democratic	Olivia Jaramillo	5,462	34.57%
Total votes		15,798	100.00%

=== District 15 ===
2020 Utah House of Representatives 15th district election
Party	Candidate	Votes	%
Republican	Brad Wilson (incumbent)	17,965	77.22%
United Utah	Ammon Gruwell	5,301	22.78%
Total votes		23,266	100.00%

=== District 16 ===
2020 Utah House of Representatives 16th district election
Party	Candidate	Votes	%
Republican	Stephen Handy (incumbent)	10,890	62.15%
Democratic	Cheryl Nunn	5,272	30.09%
Libertarian	Brent Zimmerman	1,361	7.77%
Total votes		17,523	100.00%

=== District 17 ===
Republican primary
Party	Candidate	Votes	%
Republican	Stewart Barlow (incumbent)	5,216	62.41%
Republican	Leann Wood	3,141	37.59%
Total votes		8,357	100.00%

2020 Utah House of Representatives 17th district election
Party	Candidate	Votes	%
Republican	Stewart Barlow (incumbent)	13,881	68.81%
Democratic	Eric Last	5,214	25.85%
Constitution	Jeannette Proctor	1,077	5.34%
Total votes		20,172	100.00%

=== District 18 ===
2020 Utah House of Representatives 18th district election
Party	Candidate	Votes	%
Republican	Timothy Hawkes (incumbent)	17,281	72.88%
Democratic	Katherine Nicholson	6,431	27.12%
Total votes		23,712	100.00%

=== District 19 ===
2020 Utah House of Representatives 19th district election
Party	Candidate	Votes	%
Republican	Raymond Ward (incumbent)	15,870	80.37%
Constitution	Cameron Dransfield	3,876	19.63%
Total votes		19,746	100.00%

=== District 20 ===
2020 Utah House of Representatives 20th district election
Party	Candidate	Votes	%
Republican	Melissa Garff Ballard (incumbent)	13,828	67.31%
Democratic	Phil Graves	6,717	32.69%
Total votes		20,545	100.00%

=== District 21 ===
2020 Utah House of Representatives 21st district election
Party	Candidate	Votes	%
Republican	Douglas Sagers (incumbent)	10,468	63.69%
Democratic	Stormy Simon	5,968	36.31%
Total votes		16,436	100.00%

=== District 22 ===
2020 Utah House of Representatives 22nd district election
Party	Candidate	Votes	%
Democratic	Clare Collard	7,239	50.94%
Republican	Anthony Loubet	6,973	49.06%
Total votes		14,212	100.00%

=== District 23 ===
2020 Utah House of Representatives 23rd district election
Party	Candidate	Votes	%
Democratic	Sandra Hollins (incumbent)	7,879	73.61%
Republican	Bradley Borden	2,825	26.39%
Total votes		10,704	100.00%

=== District 24 ===
2020 Utah House of Representatives 24th district election
Party	Candidate	Votes	%
Democratic	Jennifer Dailey-Provost (incumbent)	18,119	100.00%
Total votes		18,119	100.00%

=== District 25 ===
2020 Utah House of Representatives 25th district election
Party	Candidate	Votes	%
Democratic	Joel Briscoe (incumbent)	16,475	82.75%
Republican	Karel McDonough	2,827	14.20%
United Utah	Cabot Nelson	607	3.05%
Total votes		19,909	100.00%

=== District 26 ===
2020 Utah House of Representatives 26th district election
Party	Candidate	Votes	%
Democratic	Angela Romero (incumbent)	10,824	100%
Total votes		10,824	100%

=== District 27 ===
2020 Utah House of Representatives 27th district election
Party	Candidate	Votes	%
Republican	Brady Brammer (incumbent)	20,733	100%
Total votes		20,733	100%

=== District 28 ===
2020 Utah House of Representatives 28th district election
Party	Candidate	Votes	%
Democratic	Brian King (incumbent)	16,416	71.94%
Republican	Carol Hunter	6,403	28.06%
Total votes		22,819	100.00%

=== District 29 ===
2020 Utah House of Representatives 29th district election
Party	Candidate	Votes	%
Republican	Matt Gwynn	17,452	78.62%
Democratic	Kerry Wayne	4,054	18.26%
United Utah	Tanner Greenhalgh	691	3.11%
Total votes		22,197	100.00%

=== District 30 ===
2020 Utah House of Representatives 30th district election
Party	Candidate	Votes	%
Republican	Mike Winder (incumbent)	7,611	58.30%
Democratic	Robert Burch	5,443	41.70%
Total votes		13,054	100.00%

=== District 31 ===
2020 Utah House of Representatives 31st district election
Party	Candidate	Votes	%
Democratic	Elizabeth Weight (incumbent)	6,261	56.61%
Republican	Matt MacPherson	4,799	43.39%
Total votes		11,060	100.00%

=== District 32 ===
2020 Utah House of Representatives 32nd district election
Party	Candidate	Votes	%
Democratic	Suzanne Harrison (incumbent)	11,405	55.08%
Republican	Cindie Quintana	9,301	44.92%
Total votes		20,706	100.00%

=== District 33 ===
Democratic primary
Party	Candidate	Votes	%
Democratic	Fatima Dirie	695	67.74%
Democratic	Ofa Matagi	331	32.26%
Total votes		1,026	100.00%

2020 Utah House of Representatives 33rd district election
Party	Candidate	Votes	%
Republican	Craig Hall (incumbent)	5,398	50.69%
Democratic	Fatima Dirie	5,252	49.31%
Total votes		10,650	100.00%

=== District 34 ===
2020 Utah House of Representatives 34th district election
Party	Candidate	Votes	%
Democratic	Karen Kwan (incumbent)	8,558	56.99%
Republican	David Young	6,458	43.01%
Total votes		15,016	100.00%

=== District 35 ===
2020 Utah House of Representatives 35th district election
Party	Candidate	Votes	%
Democratic	Mark Wheatley (incumbent)	9,867	67.77%
Republican	Luke Guastafson	4,031	27.69%
United Utah	Adam Bean	662	4.55%
Total votes		14,560	100.00%

=== District 36 ===
2020 Utah House of Representatives 36th district election
Party	Candidate	Votes	%
Democratic	Doug Owens	14,350	59.70%
Republican	Lisa Bagley	9,365	38.96%
Constitution	Nishan Beglarian	321	1.34%
Total votes		24,036	100.00%

=== District 37 ===
2020 Utah House of Representatives 37th district election
Party	Candidate	Votes	%
Democratic	Carol Spackman Moss (incumbent)	13,037	61.13%
Republican	Maryann Christensen	8,288	38.87%
Total votes		21,325	100.00%

=== District 38 ===
2020 Utah House of Representatives 38th district election
Party	Candidate	Votes	%
Democratic	Ashlee Matthews	6,143	51.67%
Republican	Eric Hutchings (incumbent)	5,747	48.33%
Total votes		11,890	100.00%

=== District 39 ===
2020 Utah House of Representatives 39th district election
Party	Candidate	Votes	%
Republican	James Dunnigan (incumbent)	7,836	50.27%
Democratic	Lynette Wendel	7,752	49.73%
Total votes		15,588	100.00%

=== District 40 ===
2020 Utah House of Representatives 40th district election
Party	Candidate	Votes	%
Democratic	Stephanie Pitcher (incumbent)	13,261	69.42%
Republican	Jeremiah Clark	5,841	30.58%
Total votes		19,102	100.00%

=== District 41 ===
2020 Utah House of Representatives 41st district election
Party	Candidate	Votes	%
Republican	Mark Strong (incumbent)	17,312	69.40%
Democratic	Wendy Garvin	6,032	24.18%
United Utah	David Lundgren	1,602	6.42%
Total votes		24,946	100.00%

=== District 42 ===
Republican primary
Party	Candidate	Votes	%
Republican	Jordan Teuscher	3,973	57.91%
Republican	Aaron Starks	2,888	42.09%
Total votes		6,861	100.00%

2020 Utah House of Representatives 42nd district election
Party	Candidate	Votes	%
Republican	Jordan Teuscher	14,011	58.53%
Democratic	Samuel Winkler	8,749	36.55%
United Utah	Ryan Boudwin	1,178	4.92%
Total votes		23,938	100.00%

=== District 43 ===
2020 Utah House of Representatives 43rd district election
Party	Candidate	Votes	%
Republican	Cheryl Acton (incumbent)	7,988	52.36%
Democratic	Diane Lewis	6,443	42.23%
United Utah	Jefferson Bardin	825	5.41%
Total votes		15,256	100.00%

=== District 44 ===
2020 Utah House of Representatives 44th district election
Party	Candidate	Votes	%
Democratic	Andrew Stoddard (incumbent)	10,346	55.69%
Republican	Kyle Bird	7,498	40.36%
United Utah	John Jackson	733	3.95%
Total votes		18,577	100.00%

=== District 45 ===
2020 Utah House of Representatives 45th district election
Party	Candidate	Votes	%
Republican	Steve Eliason (incumbent)	9,748	50.20%
Democratic	Wendy Davis	9,671	49.80%
Total votes		19,419	100.00%

=== District 46 ===
2020 Utah House of Representatives 46th district election
Party	Candidate	Votes	%
Democratic	Gay Bennion	12,467	56.61%
Republican	Jaren Davis	8,520	38.69%
Libertarian	Lee Anne Walker	1,034	4.70%
Total votes		22,021	100.00%

=== District 47 ===
Republican primary
Party	Candidate	Votes	%
Republican	Steve Christiansen (incumbent)	2,943	58.10%
Republican	Nathan Brown	2,122	41.90%
Total votes		5,065	100.00%

2020 Utah House of Representatives 47th district election
Party	Candidate	Votes	%
Republican	Steve Christiansen (incumbent)	9,285	57.49%
Democratic	Scott Bell	6,867	42.51%
Total votes		16,152	100.00%

=== District 48 ===
Republican primary
Party	Candidate	Votes	%
Republican	Keven Stratton (incumbent)	4,271	50.32%
Republican	David Shallenberger	4,217	49.68%
Total votes		8,488	100.00%

=== District 49 ===
2020 Utah House of Representatives 49th district election
Party	Candidate	Votes	%
Republican	Robert Spendlove (incumbent)	12,075	53.84%
Democratic	Siamak Khadjenoury	10,353	46.16%
Total votes		22,428	100.00%

=== District 50 ===
2020 Utah House of Representatives 50th district election
Party	Candidate	Votes	%
Republican	Susan Pulsipher (incumbent)	19,125	71.47%
Democratic	Emily Hayes	7,636	28.53%
Total votes		26,761	100.00%

=== District 51 ===
2020 Utah House of Representatives 51st district election
Party	Candidate	Votes	%
Republican	Jeff Stenquist (incumbent)	12,773	63.36%
Democratic	David Hunt	7,385	36.64%
Total votes		20,158	100.00%

=== District 52 ===
2020 Utah House of Representatives 52nd district election
Party	Candidate	Votes	%
Republican	Candice Pierucci (incumbent)	21,126	69.86%
Democratic	Catherine Voutaz	9,113	30.14%
Total votes		30,239	100.00%

=== District 53 ===
2020 Utah House of Representatives 53rd district election
Party	Candidate	Votes	%
Republican	Kera Birkeland	15,142	63.62%
Democratic	Cheryl Butler	8,657	36.38%
Total votes		23,799	100.00%

=== District 54 ===
Republican primary
Party	Candidate	Votes	%
Republican	Mike Kohler	5,207	66.20%
Republican	Randy Favero	2,658	33.80%
Total votes		7,865	100.00%

2020 Utah House of Representatives 54th district election
Party	Candidate	Votes	%
Republican	Mike Kohler	14,275	54.33%
Democratic	Meaghan Miller	11,999	45.67%
Total votes		26,274	100.00%

=== District 55 ===
2020 Utah House of Representatives 55th district election
Party	Candidate	Votes	%
Republican	Scott Chew (incumbent)	15,774	100%
Total votes		15,774	100%

=== District 56 ===
Republican primary
Party	Candidate	Votes	%
Republican	Kay Christofferson (incumbent)	4,965	58.49%
Republican	Randy Favero	3,523	41.51%
Total votes		8,488	100.00%

2020 Utah House of Representatives 56th district election
Party	Candidate	Votes	%
Republican	Kay Christofferson (incumbent)	15,844	81.59%
United Utah	Kate Walters	3,576	18.41%
Total votes		19,420	100.00%

=== District 57 ===
2020 Utah House of Representatives 57th district election
Party	Candidate	Votes	%
Republican	Jon Hawkins (incumbent)	17,451	100%
Total votes		17,451	100%

=== District 58 ===
Republican primary
Party	Candidate	Votes	%
Republican	Steven Lund	5,203	57.47%
Republican	Clinton Painter	3,850	42.53%
Total votes		9,053	100.00%

2020 Utah House of Representatives 58th district election
Party	Candidate	Votes	%
Republican	Steven Lund	14,401	84.63%
Constitution	Russell Hatch	1,807	10.62%
United Utah	J. Homer Morrill	809	4.75%
Total votes		17,017	100.00%

=== District 59 ===
2020 Utah House of Representatives 59th district election
Party	Candidate	Votes	%
Republican	Val Peterson (incumbent)	15,142	75.77%
United Utah	Catherine Eslinger	4,841	24.23%
Total votes		16,069	100.00%

=== District 60 ===
2020 Utah House of Representatives 60th district election
Party	Candidate	Votes	%
Republican	Nelson Abbott	11,683	72.71%
United Utah	Christine Heath	3,540	22.03%
Independent	Tommy Williams	846	5.26%
Total votes		16,069	100.00%

=== District 61 ===
Republican primary
Party	Candidate	Votes	%
Republican	Marsha Judkins (incumbent)	3,760	64.45%
Republican	Kenneth Grover	2,074	35.55%
Total votes		5,834	100.00%

2020 Utah House of Representatives 61st district election
Party	Candidate	Votes	%
Republican	Marsha Judkins (incumbent)	11,893	79.67%
United Utah	Nils Bergeson	3,034	20.33%
Total votes		14,927	100.00%

=== District 62 ===
2020 Utah House of Representatives 62nd district election
Party	Candidate	Votes	%
Republican	Travis Seegmiller (incumbent)	22,562	100%
Total votes		22,562	100%

=== District 63 ===
2020 Utah House of Representatives 63rd district election
Party	Candidate	Votes	%
Republican	Adam Robertson (incumbent)	4,731	60.95%
Democratic	Jenna Rakuita	2,443	31.47%
United Utah	Austin Simcox	588	7.58%
Total votes		7,762	100.00%

=== District 64 ===
2020 Utah House of Representatives 64th district election
Party	Candidate	Votes	%
Republican	Norm Thurston (incumbent)	11,536	100%
Total votes		11,536	100%

=== District 65 ===
2020 Utah House of Representatives 65th district election
Party	Candidate	Votes	%
Republican	Francis Gibson (incumbent)	18,636	100%
Total votes		18,636	100%

=== District 66 ===
Republican primary
Party	Candidate	Votes	%
Republican	Jefferson Burton	4,675	60.01%
Republican	Kari Malkovich	3,115	39.99%
Total votes		7,790	100.00%

2020 Utah House of Representatives 66th district election
Party	Candidate	Votes	%
Republican	Jefferson Burton	17,515	100%
Total votes		17,515	100%

=== District 67 ===
2020 Utah House of Representatives 67th district election
Party	Candidate	Votes	%
Republican	Doug Welton	18,478	100%
Total votes		18,478	100%

=== District 68 ===
2020 Utah House of Representatives 68th district election
Party	Candidate	Votes	%
Republican	Merrill Nelson (incumbent)	16,036	75.32%
Democratic	Amiee Finster	3,334	15.66%
Constitution	Kirk Pearson	1,920	9.02%
Total votes		21,290	100.00%

=== District 69 ===
2020 Utah House of Representatives 69th district election
Party	Candidate	Votes	%
Republican	Christine Watkins (incumbent)	13,077	100%
Total votes		13,077	100%

=== District 70 ===
2020 Utah House of Representatives 70th district election
Party	Candidate	Votes	%
Republican	Carl Albrecht (incumbent)	14,488	81.85%
Democratic	Jessica O'Leary	3,212	18.15%
Total votes		17,700	100.00%

=== District 71 ===
Republican primary
Party	Candidate	Votes	%
Republican	Bradley Last (incumbent)	5,475	52.10%
Republican	Willie Billings	5,033	47.90%
Total votes		10,508	100.00%

2020 Utah House of Representatives 71st district election
Party	Candidate	Votes	%
Republican	Bradley Last (incumbent)	20,372	100%
Total votes		20,372	100%

=== District 72 ===
2020 Utah House of Representatives 72nd district election
Party	Candidate	Votes	%
Republican	Rex Shipp (incumbent)	13,858	75.39%
Democratic	Lonnie White	3,149	17.13%
United Utah	Piper Manesse	1,374	7.48%
Total votes		18,381	100.00%

=== District 73 ===
2020 Utah House of Representatives 73rd district election
Party	Candidate	Votes	%
Republican	Phil Lyman (incumbent)	14,518	100%
Total votes		14,518	100%

=== District 74 ===
2020 Utah House of Representatives 74th district election
Party	Candidate	Votes	%
Republican	V. Lowry Snow (incumbent)	18,196	73.36%
Democratic	Kenzie Carter	6,607	26.64%
Total votes		24,803	100.00%

=== District 75 ===
2020 Utah House of Representatives 75th district election
Party	Candidate	Votes	%
Republican	Walt Brooks (incumbent)	13,984	76.44%
Democratic	Rebecca Sullivan	4,310	23.56%
Total votes		18,294	100.00%
