= Diane Lewis (politician) =

American politician from Utah

Chair of the Utah Democratic Party
- In office September 29, 2021 – May 31, 2025; Acting: September 29, 2021 – December 5, 2021
- Preceded by: Jeff Marchant
- Succeeded by: Brian King

Personal details
- Born: Illinois, U.S.
- Political party: Democratic
- Education: El Camino College

Diane Lewis is an American trade unionist and politician who served as the chair of the Utah Democratic Party from 2021 to 2025.

== Early life ==
Lewis was born in Illinois but moved to California and she was raised in the greater Los Angeles area before moving to Utah in 1999.

== Career ==
Lewis has worked for the Laborers' International Union of North America for many years. She made history becoming the first woman to be elected as a secretary-treasurer of a labor union in the state of Utah.

Lewis was a candidate in the 2020 Utah House of Representatives election in District 43 but was defeated by Republican Cheryl Acton. She was an unsuccessful candidate for the same seat in 2014 losing to Earl Tanner.

In 2021, Lewis became interim chair of the Utah Democratic Party following the resignation of Jeff Marchant. She had previously been vice-chair. In 2023, she was re-elected. In 2023, she organised a virtual convention for the state party.

Lewis oversaw the 2024 Utah Democratic presidential primary. Lewis endorsed the Joe Biden 2024 presidential campaign. In July 2024 with the withdrawal of Biden from the election, Lewis paid tribute to the president but did not immediately endorse the campaign of Kamala Harris. She later endorsed the Kamala Harris 2024 presidential campaign alongside the entire Utah delegation.

Party political offices
Preceded by Jeff Marchant	Chair of the Utah Democratic Party; 2021–2025	Succeeded by Brian King
