= Utah Inland Port =

- Interactive map of Utah Inland Port

Location
- Country: United States
- Location: Salt Lake City, Utah
- Coordinates: 40°45′36″N 112°01′30″W

Details
- Operated by: Utah Inland Port Authority
- Type of harbour: Dry port
- Land area: 16,000 acres
- Executive Director: Ben Hart

Statistics
- Website https://inlandportauthority.utah.gov/

The Utah Inland Port Authority (UIPA) is a special-purpose public entity created by the Utah Legislature in 2018 to plan, finance, and oversee “inland port” project areas across the state that support freight logistics and economic development. Headquartered in Salt Lake City, the authority coordinates rail-served, intermodal, and industrial infrastructure through designated project areas and interlocal agreements; it does not operate a seaport. UIPA is governed by a state-created board and led by an executive director (Ben Hart as of 2025). In recent years the authority has emphasized a network of smaller regional hubs rather than a single site and has undertaken projects such as remediation of the former North Temple Landfill. UIPA’s activities have drawn both support and criticism, including litigation and debates over environmental impacts and governance.

The Port Authority is governed by a Port Authority Board. Per Utah Code, five voting board members are appointed, and seven hold their post ex officio The current board chair is Utah House of Representatives Chief of Staff Abby Osborne; its previous chairs include World Trade Center Executive Director Miles Hansen, West Valley Assistant Manager Nicole Cottle, Salt Lake City Councilman James Rogers, and President and CEO of the Salt Lake Chamber of Commerce Derek Miller.

== History ==
In 2016, the University of Utah submitted an assessment regarding a potential inland port in the Salt Lake City area. Funded by the World Trade Center Utah and the Governor's Office of Economic Development, the report found the potential for strong economic benefits, including high-paying job opportunities, and rural economic development. It also found a need to perform additional studies on environmental impacts and the effect on tax revenues.

Also in 2016, Governor Gary Herbert created an Inland Port Exploratory Committee to "drive the development" of an inland port in Utah. At the time, he stated that "despite anti-trade, isolationist rhetoric at the national level, Utah remains committed to promoting international trade."

The Inland Port Authority and Inland Port were created as legal entities by the Utah State Legislature, in bill SB234, in 2018. The boundaries of the port were first spelled out at this time, amounting to about 16,000 acres.

In 2019, HB0433 significantly broadened the Inland Port Authority's reach. The proposed boundaries amount to approximately one-third of Salt Lake City's land area.

On March 11, 2019, Salt Lake City Mayor Jackie Biskupski and the Salt Lake City's Attorney's Office brought a lawsuit against the port, challenging the legality of the legislation underlying the port's creation. On January 9, 2020, the presiding judge rejected the city's claims and dismissed the case. The city's new mayor, Erin Mendenhall, called the decision a "disappointment" but stated she planned to appeal the decision to the state Supreme Court. The Utah State Supreme Court heard oral arguments from both parties in April 2021. In June 2022, the Utah Supreme Court ruled the port’s existence was not unconstitutional and continued development could proceed.

In September 2022, the Port Authority announced it would “pause… all major capital projects” until it develops a “Northwest Quadrant Master Development Plan.” Also in September, a third-party analysis sponsored by activism group Stop the Polluting Port concluded that the proposed transloading facility on Salt Lake City's west end would be uneconomical and fail to provide expected benefits.

=== Port project areas ===
Beginning in April 2023, the Utah Inland Port Authority expanded from one inland port area in the northwest quadrant of Salt Lake County, Utah to include thirteen additional port project areas throughout the state of Utah.

Utah Inland Port Project Areas
Project Area	Location	Creation Date	Ancient Sky	Iron County	April 2025
Castle Country	Carbon and Emery County	June 2024			
Historic Capitol	Fillmore	August 2024			
Iron Springs	Iron County	April 2023			
Pony Express	Utah County	June 2025			
Skyline Corridor	Sanpete, Sevier, and Wayne Counties	October 2024			
Verk Industrial Park	Spanish Fork	July 2023			
Golden Spike	Box Elder County	August 2023			
Central Utah Agri-Park	Juab County	September 2023			
Mineral Mountains	Beaver County	October 2023			
Tooele Valley	Tooele	December 2023			
Twenty Wells	Grantsville	December 2023			
West Weber	Weber County	May 2024			

In 2024, a ninth port was approved, on 9,000 acres in the Weber River area. A Weber county representative said that major polluters would not be allowed into the satellite port due to it being in a nonattainment status already.

== Environment ==
=== Air quality ===
The Utah Inland Port would increase train traffic and could increase coal consumption.

The Inland Port is located in non-attainment zones for several airborne pollutants, meaning that current air quality standards are not met. Critics argue that the presence of an inland port would increase diesel truck traffic in the area and therefore further exacerbate poor air quality in Utah. Also, language adopted in the Utah code makes it difficult to regulate natural resources moving through the Inland Port; critics fear the port's presence would ease the export of coal, thus increasing its usage and associated environmental impacts including climate change.

State Senator Luz Escamilla introduced a bill in the Utah state legislature that would fund the Utah Department of Environmental Quality to install air and water monitors at the site of the proposed port, to establish baseline readings for future comparison.

No official environmental impact study has been completed, although Miller had stated one would be complete by the first quarter of 2019. A final draft of the port's overall business plan - with an environmental sustainability plan included - was released in May 2020. It was approved unanimously by the board the next month despite negative public comments.

Similar warehouse complexes in central California's Inland Empire area have seen increased truck exhaust, being colloquially dubbed "diesel death zones" and leading to additional regulations on emissions.

=== Traffic congestion ===
A critical analysis estimates the Inland Port's presence could create about 11,600 new truck trips and 23,000 additional car trips daily, at half of the Port's developable potential. "By way of comparison, the total number of daily vehicle trips on I-80 between downtown and the [Salt Lake City International] airport was about 42,000 in 2017," the report states. "This traffic would not only affect I-80 but also I-15 and other streets serving the Port area, including Bangerter Highway and 5600 West."

=== Wetlands ===
The Great Salt Lake is currently at half of its historical size; the shrinkage can be attributed directly to withdrawals for industrial, agricultural and economic activities. Additionally, the ecosystem surrounding the lake is considered to be under severe stress due to the falling water levels and other human activities. Environmental advocates are concerned the port's presence would increase the environmental pressures on the ecosystem and increase water expenditures. (Joliet, IL, the site of America's largest inland port, is estimated to be less than a decade from running out of water completely. The largest warehouses in the port area use tens of millions of gallons of water yearly.) Millions of migratory birds also use the land as a stopover point yearly.

In November 2023, the Utah Inland Port Authority board adopted a wetlands policy allowing for at least 1% of tax differential for project areas containing wetlands within the Great Salt Lake or Utah Lake watershed. The policy allows for incentives that encourage developers to preserve wetland habitats impacted by future projects, though it does not explicitly mandate preservation.

== Criticisms and controversy ==
=== Loss of local control ===
Salt Lake City leaders have argued that the State Legislature is unfairly taking control of local land. SB 234 gave the Inland Port Authority administrative authority over all land-use decisions, and the power to capture 100 percent of newly generated taxes within the inland port borders. This would amount to millions of dollars in tax revenue that would not be captured by Salt Lake City for local property taxes.

City leaders also assert that the creation of the inland port would take tax revenue that would otherwise have gone to Salt Lake City schools and libraries. The Utah League of Cities & Towns called the creation of the Inland Port Authority "nothing short of a state takeover of a swath of Salt Lake City without the city's consent." Prior to the passage of SB 234, Salt Lake City had approved a master plan that governed the development of the inland port area, as well as agreements with northwest quadrant landowners committing to reinvest tax revenues into the area to aid development. That master plan and agreements would be superseded by the creation of the inland port.

The Salt Lake County Council was not consulted during negotiations over SB 234. The County Council asked Governor Herbert to veto the bill.

HB 433 allowed the Inland Port Authority to expand its reach outside of the boundaries currently set, and prohibited any city from bringing legal action against the port, or any other challenge to the authority's creation or existence. In the runup to its passage, Jackie Biskupski stated "this bill effectively creates a government entity, not only unaccountable to the community but immune from judicial scrutiny, closing the courtroom door to local communities." Supporters of the bill stated its goal was to allow other interested cities or counties to join the port project.

The land the port would be built on was once considered sacred by the Shoshone, Ute and Goshute Indian tribes.

=== Lack of transparency and conflicts of interest ===
The bill establishing the Inland Port was passed by the Utah Legislature with broad changes from earlier versions with little time for public comment and review. The bill was discussed for only 15 minutes on the floor of the state legislature. "The citizens of the Westpointe Community Council, which encompasses most of the [area of the inland port], believe the Legislature's late introduction of this bill (SB234) is by design to impede fair and proper citizen and stakeholder due process," said Terry Thomas, vice chairman of the community council.

Greg Hughes, who was the Speaker of the Utah House of Representatives when HB 234 was passed, appointed himself as an Inland Port board member. Less than a week later, he resigned from this position, after it was discovered that he owned property which was close enough to the port boundaries to have legally disqualified him from being on the board in the first place.

In August 2018, board members voted 9-2 against making board subcommittee meetings available for public access. Eventually the board did away with subcommittee meetings altogether.

The board's ex-chair, Derek Miller - who is also the chair of the Salt Lake Chamber of Commerce - sent an email in October 2019 inviting a national rail business a spot on the chamber's "exclusive" Inland Port Committee, in exchange for $10,000. Critics have suggested this represents a "pay-to-play" impropriety. Miller later called the fundraising email a mistake.

=== Protests ===
In April 2019, environmental activists disrupted the port board's monthly meeting.

In May 2019, environmental advocates demonstrated against the port.

On June 5, 2019, protestors disrupted the Inland Port Authority board meeting.

On July 9, 2019, about 100 protestors stormed the Salt Lake Chamber of Commerce building to protest the port. Fourteen were later charged with riot and criminal trespass after the protests turned violent.

On August 14, 2019, a "working group" meeting was disrupted by protestors.

On October 17, 2019, activists again protested the Inland Port Authority public board meeting.

On September 20, 2021, Protestors gathered outside of the 111 main office of the Port Authority and managed to postpone a meeting designated to create a Public Infrastructure District (PID).
