= Adam Gardiner =

Adam Gardiner may refer to:

- Adam Gardiner (actor) (born 1966), New Zealand voice, film, and television actor
- Adam Gardiner (politician), former member of the Utah State legislature
