= Air quality in Utah =

Quality of air in Utah

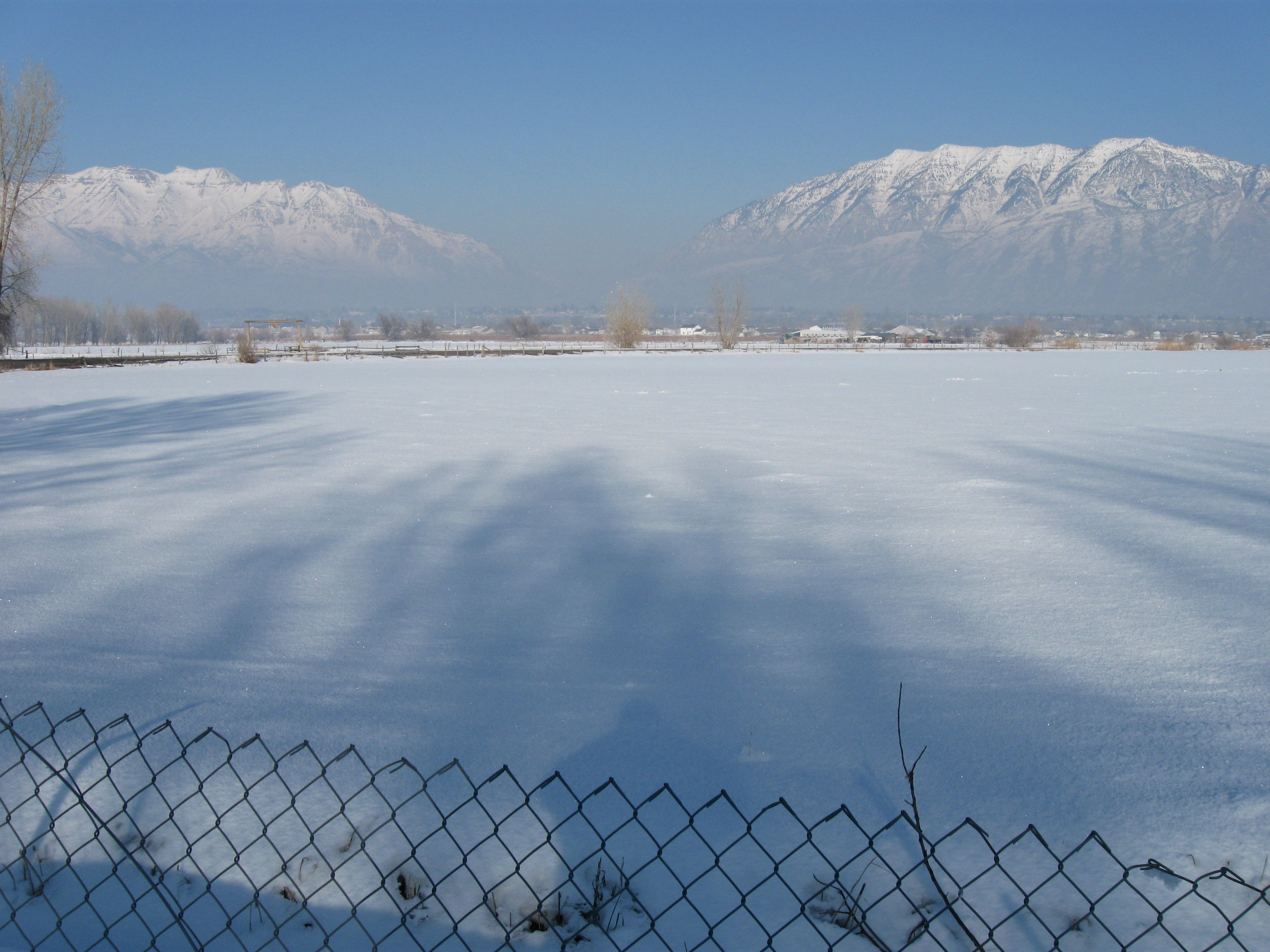
Winter inversion obscuring view of distant Provo Canyon. Pollutants lead to low contrast near the base of the mountains.

Air quality in Utah is often some of the worst in the United States. Poor air quality in Utah is due to the mountainous topography which can cause pollutants to build up near the surface (especially during inversions) combined with the prevalence of emissions from gasoline- and diesel-powered vehicles, especially older models. Burning wood fuel for home heating can also contribute significantly to poor air quality. Homes heated with wood contribute about 3000 times the amount of pollution as homes heated with natural gas. About 50% of air pollution in Salt Lake County is from vehicles.

In 2024 the American Lung Association (ALA) ranked Salt Lake City-Provo-Orem area as the 9th worst city for ozone air quality in the U.S. and 19th for worst short-term particle pollution. Logan was ranked the 21st worst city for short-term particle pollution. Of the 14 counties with ozone data from 2020 to 2022, 6 received an "F" grade by the ALA, and 6 of 10 counties monitored received an "F" for particulate pollution. An MIT study estimated that over 450 deaths annually in Utah are due to poor air quality.

Utah has had mixed responses to poor air quality. For example, from 2015 to 2016 the state offered up to a $1500 credit for clean fuel vehicles However, in 2019 Utah began imposing an additional registration fee on clean fuel vehicles that will increase to $120 annually by 2021.

== Inversions and air quality ==
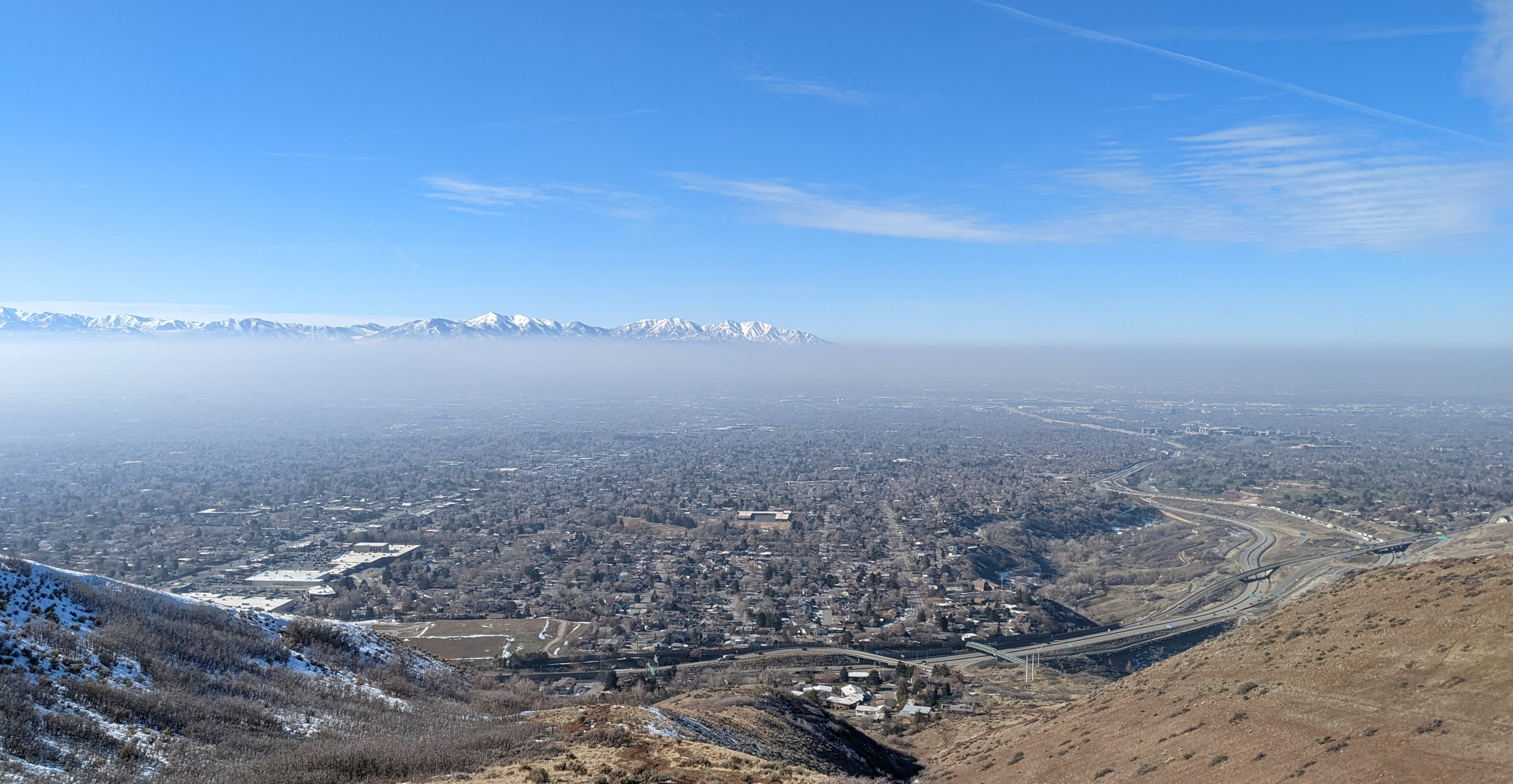
Winter inversion in the Salt Lake Valley seen from Grandeur Peak.

Due to the mountainous terrain and cold winters, inversions frequently occur in Utah and throughout the Intermountain West. While inversions are a natural phenomenon, when coupled with community emissions from gasoline and diesel vehicles, wood fires, industry, and agriculture they can cause unnatural accumulations of hazardous pollutants (especially PM_{2.5}). A typical winter in Salt Lake City has about 6 multi-day inversions that lead to about 18 days of pollution above National Ambient Air Quality Standards. Pollution for inversions can begin to build-up even when the air is clear.

To improve air quality, especially during inversions, there are restrictions on burning wood fires with fines starting at $150 for first-time offenses in Salt Lake County. Emissions can be reduced by using gasoline and diesel vehicles less by more carpooling and taking public transit, less idling, use of newer vehicles (especially clean fuel vehicles), and combining trips. Less use of gas-powered snow blowers, fireworks, gas-powered lawnmowers, and materials with high volatile organic compound emissions such as certain paints can help keep air clean throughout the year.

== Pollutants, sources, and health concerns ==
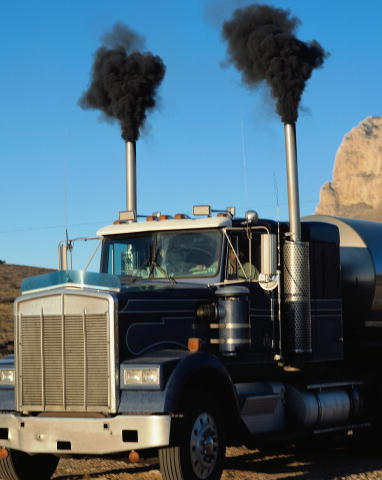
This diesel-powered truck emits an exhaust gas rich in black particulate matter when starting its engine. Mobile sources, including both gasoline and diesel vehicles, are one of the leading contributors to poor air quality in Utah. Most hazardous mobile emissions are not as visible as in this picture.

Two pollutant measurements of highest concern for health are PM_{2.5} (or amount of fine particulates with diameters of 2.5 μm or less) of and ozone levels. PM_{2.5} is usually the pollutant of concern in winters in Utah, and ozone is the pollutant of concern in summers. To try and reduce negative health effects of outdoor air quality in Utah, at risk groups (including the young, the elderly, and those who exercise outdoors) are advised to stay indoors. School children in Utah have been kept inside during poor air quality events.

Particulates, especially smaller ones such as PM_{2.5}, can enter deep into the lungs to cause or worsen respiratory disease issues, and decrease lung function. Particulates can cross into the blood stream and cause irregular heartbeats, heart attacks, and strokes. Particulates can also cross the blood–brain barrier and cause degenerative brain diseases such as Dementia and Alzheimer's, mental illness, and reduced intelligence. PM_{2.5} is the largest component of Utah's wintertime pollution. Particulates can be emitted either directly (primary) from sources like exhaust gas, wood fires and fireworks, or can form in the atmosphere (secondary) from chemicals emitted from VOCs like fuel and household products (like paints), and gaseous vehicle emissions of NOx.

Ozone is helpful to block UV radiation when at high above the ground in the stratosphere. Ozone can damage mucous tissues such as lung linings, as well as vegetation. Ozone can also form from reactions of VOCs or carbon monoxide and NOx. Exposure to higher levels of ozone during pregnancy has been linked with an increased risk of stillbirth, infant mortality, and brain disorders.

PM_{2.5} and ozone levels are converted from scientific units (like μg m^{−3}) to air quality index levels. The maximum AQI across a variety of pollutants is often what gets reported. The Utah DEQ publishes AQI levels. Levels are aggregated into groups including "Good," "Moderate" (health concern for particularly sensitive people), "Unhealthy for Sensitive Groups" (including children, the elderly, and those with existing cardiovascular problems), with higher levels of "Unhealthy", "Very Unhealthy", and "Hazardous" affecting everyone. AQI can be delayed by up to a day compared to current conditions.

A Utah Physicians for a Healthy Environment study estimated 1,000–2,000 deaths in Utah annually due to poor air quality. An MIT study estimated 200,000 premature deaths occur in the U.S. each year as a result of poor air quality, with the most significant contribution from vehicles. The study estimated 461 premature deaths in Utah annually due to high levels of ozone and particulate matter, with vehicle emissions leading to 147 of the deaths annually. By comparison there were 273 deaths due to motor vehicle crashes in Utah in 2017.

About 200 Utahans go to the hospital with severe pneumonia due to particulate pollution each year. Emergency room respiratory-related visits in Salt Lake City increased by 40% during pollution episodes in 2014.

Air quality related mortality in Utah. NM = number of premature deaths. MR = mortality rate (deaths per 100,000 people)
	Electric gen		Industry		Comm/Res		Road		Marine		Rail	
Pollutant	NM	MR	NM	MR	NM	MR	NM	MR	NM	MR	NM	MR
PM_{2.5}	58	2.6	88	3.9	107	4.8	145	6.5	6	0.3	10	0.5
Ozone	9	0.42	6	0.27	1	0.06	27	1.21	1	0.05	3	0.13

=== Wildfires ===
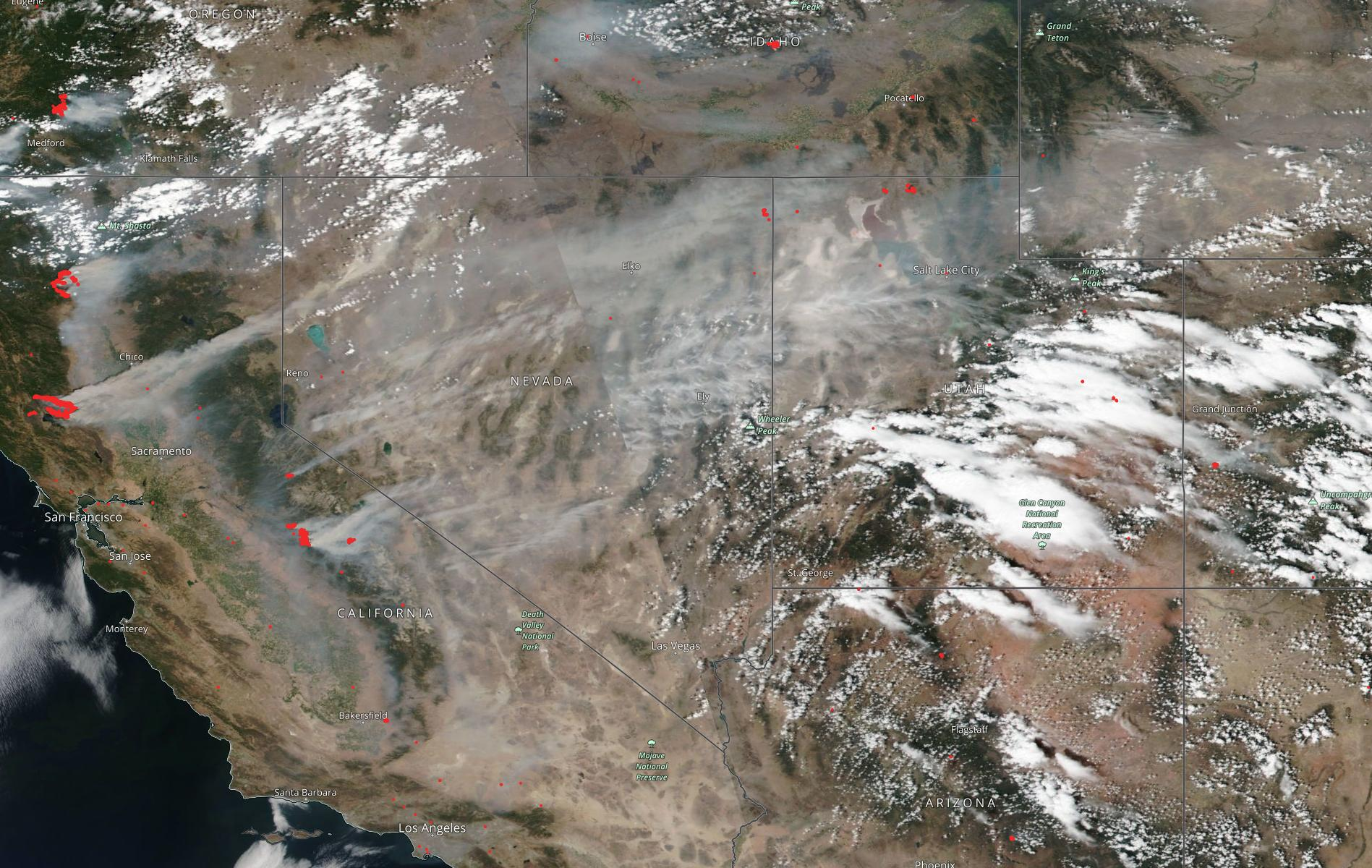
Satellite imagery from August 4, 2018 showing smoke from California fires blowing eastward into Utah.

Wildfires from within the state, the Pacific Northwest, California, Idaho, Nevada, and even Arizona can drastically reduce air quality.

In August 2020 smoke drifted in from California fires which caused PM_{2.5} levels to exceed 90 mg m^{−3} in Cache County, Utah, over 2.5 as high as the federal threshold level of 35 mg m^{−3}. Researchers were concerned the poor air quality would worsen symptoms from COVID-19. Air quality in southern Utah was negatively affected by Veyo West and Turkey Farm Road Fires in Washington County as well as fires in Nevada. Smoke from the Bush and Magnum fires in Arizona blew up into Utah in June 2020.

In July 2021 high episodes of pollution were caused from the Bootleg Fire in southern Oregon, and the Beckwourth Complex Fire in northern California. In Salt Lake County pollution levels reached the 'unhealthy category' and even the normally healthy population was at risk for negative health impacts. On August 6 in Salt Lake City smoke originating from the Dixie Fire and other fires in west coast states caused the PM_{2.5} level to spike to over 100 mg m^{−3}, more than 3 times the federal standard. The area temporarily had the worst air quality in the world.

=== The Great Salt Lake ===
The Great Salt Lake has been shrinking, exposing more dried lake bed. Researchers are concerned about particulates and arsenic blowing off the lake into urban areas.

== Research ==
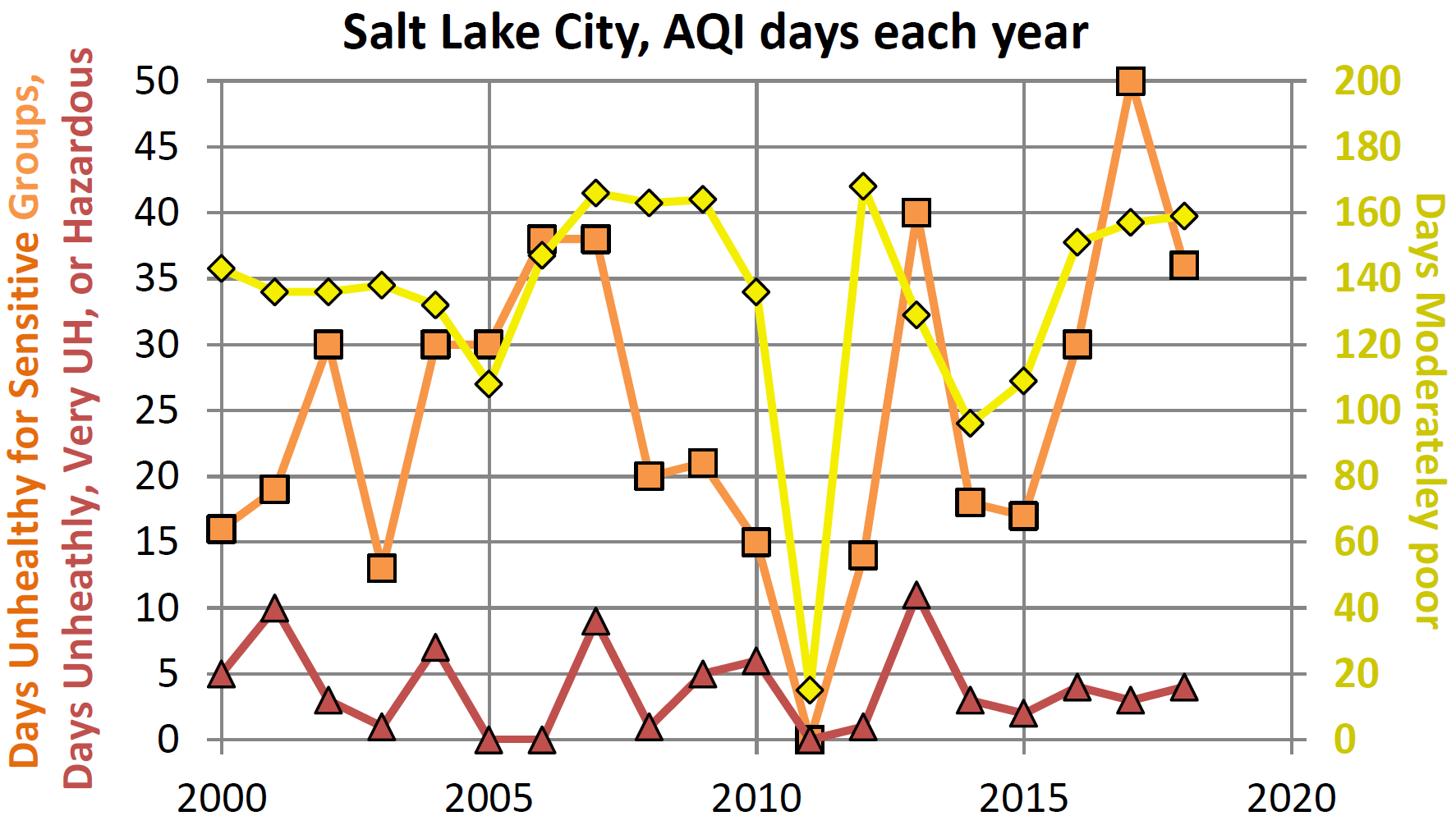
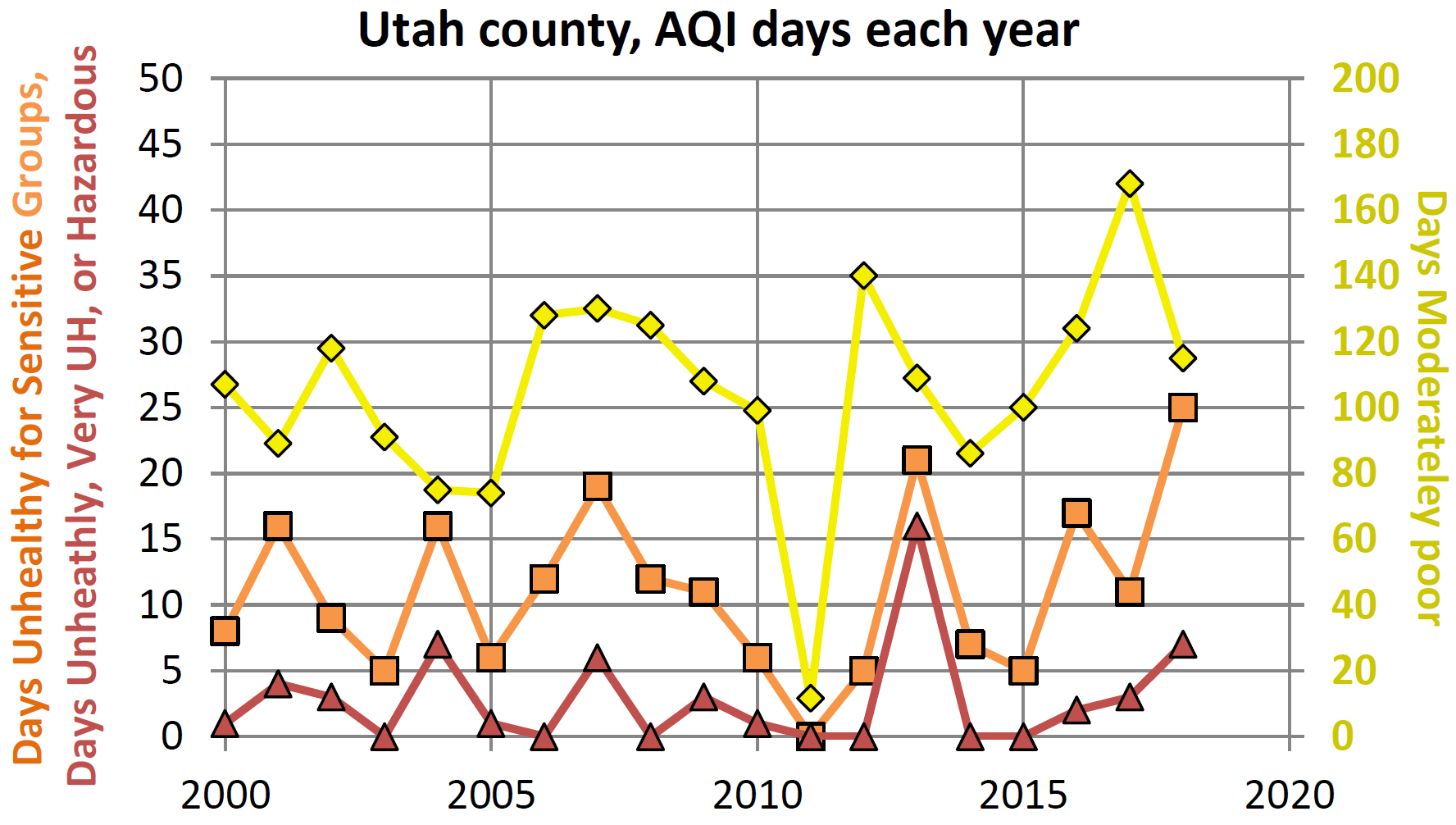
Days in various AQI categories for SLC and Utah county. Approximately half of the days are not in the "Good" category (not shown).

=== Air quality monitoring ===
Various organizations monitor the air quality in Utah. The Utah Division of Air Quality has been monitoring air quality indicators since 1999 with the Utah Air Monitoring Network. University of Utah scientists have installed monitors on Trax cars on the Red and Green lines in 2015. Though not unique to Utah, Purple Air monitoring network provides particulate levels in real time. Unlike other networks, Purple Air sensors can be purchased and installed by anyone.

Measurement campaigns focused on Utah air quality have brought in international researchers. In 2017 the Utah Winter Fine Particulate Study (UWFPS) involved intensive studies from the air and ground of particulates and their formation in northern Utah basins in winter. Researchers were from NOAA ESRL, the Utah Division of Air Quality, the University of Utah, University of Toronto, University of Washington, and USDA.

=== Epidemiology ===
Some of the most recognized globally recognized epidemiological studies of air quality on human health have been performed in Utah. BYU professor Arden Pope has been researching health and air quality for over 30 years. Pope's research began by using changes in emissions from the Geneva Steel plant in Utah Valley in a natural experiment. Pope noted an "astonishing" difference in admissions for pediatric respiratory hospital admissions when the plant was not operating. A 2016 study linked poor air quality with blood vessel damage in BYU students. An analysis by the Salt Lake Tribune noted increased school absences along the Wasatch Front during air pollution episodes in Utah, though additional research is needed to determine whether or not absences were due to other coinciding incidents. Life expectancy increased by about 3 years from 1980 to 2000 and 5 months of that were attributed to better air quality by Pope.

== Legislation ==
Legislation in Utah in response to poor air quality has been mixed, with some laws and ordinances expected to help, and others expected to worsen air quality. The Governor's FY 2020 budget by Gary Herbert recommended $100 million for air quality improvements. Only $29 million was spent on air quality initiatives, but it was more than the typical $2 million.

Previously a credit up to $1500 was offered for purchasing clean air vehicles. However, in 2018 SB136 was controversially signed into law by Gary Herbert. The law, which was sponsored by Wayne Harper and Mike Schultz, implements an additional annual registration fee of up to $120 on clean air vehicles by the year 2020. The additional fees were opposed by air quality advocates such as the nonprofits Breathe Utah, and Utah Clean Energy which has stated the fees are misguided. Clean air advocates have voiced concerns that the additional fees will slow electric vehicle adoption in Utah and promote poorer air quality. Gasoline vehicles are the main source of pollution in Utah. In 2022 HB 186 sponsored by Harper and Raymond Ward was signed into law by Spencer Cox which will further increase electric vehicle fees to $240 by 2032.

On January 1, 2017 most oil refineries in the U.S. were required to start meeting Environmental Protection Agency rules for Tier 3 fuels which would reduce NO_{X}, VOC, and sulfur emissions. Due to their smaller size, the five refineries in Utah were exempt from the EPA requirement, and the state of Utah allowed the exemption. The Silver Eagle refinery voluntarily met the requirement in 2018, and Andeavor and Chevron voluntarily committed to meet the standard by January 1, 2020. Holly and Big West (a subsidiary of FJ Management) have not made commitments to meet the standard early. Utah lawmakers passed tax breaks of $2M per year for the refineries to meet the requirements early.

Utah has been opposed to allowing California to set higher standards for fuel efficiency and for reduced emissions for higher standards of air quality than the federal government. Utah legislators Stephen Handy and Suzanne Harrison have spoken out against the rollback of fuel standards by the Trump administration, citing negative effects of air pollution in Utah on health. Utah senator Mitt Romney has voiced support for greater efficiency standards without supporting the higher standards set by California. In 2019 he voiced support for continued use of all energy sources including higher polluting sources such as burning coal.

Anti-idling ordinances were passed in Salt Lake City in 2011 with fines of up to $210 for idling for more than 2 minutes. As of 2018, seventy-one cities encouraged idle-free behavior. The laws have led to few citations, but supporters celebrate them for making idling gasoline and diesel vehicles socially unacceptable.

The Utah Indoor Clean Air Act is a statewide smoking ban, that prohibits smoking in many public places.

=== EV Legislation ===
- SB136 2018 (passed) In addition to regular registration fees added EV fees of $60 in 2019, $90 in 2020, and $120 in 2021. This also directed the start of a Road Usage Charge (RUC) program where additional fees can be paid at a certain rate in cents per mile. In 2020, the RUC rate was 1.5 billed monthly. To enroll in the program participants need to install an OBD device to allow a third-party to track them.
- HB209 2021 (failed) Would have increased additional EV fees to $240 annually in 2024.
- HB186 2022 (passed) Increases additional annual EV fee from $120 to $130.25 in 2023, or a RUC of 1.0. Increases fee to $180 in 2026 or a RUC of 1.25. Increases fee to $240 in 2032 or a RUC of 1.5.
- HB301 2023 (passed) This adds a third tax at EV charging stations in Utah on top of existing sales and franchise taxes. This new tax is 12.5% and some analyses estimate some EV owners will pay twice as much tax as gasoline fueled vehicle drivers.

== See also ==
- Air pollution in the United States
- Utah Inland Port
