= James Dunnigan =

James Dunnigan may refer to:

- Jim Dunnigan (James F. Dunnigan, born 1943), author and military-political analyst
- James Dunnigan (politician) (born 1953), American politician in the Utah House of Representatives
