= Utah Division =

Utah Division may refer to:

- Utah Division (D&RGW) of the Denver and Rio Grande Western Railroad, now Union Pacific
- Utah Division of Air Quality
- Utah Division of Arts and Museums
- Utah Division of Occupational & Professional Licensing
- Utah Division of Parks and Recreation
- Utah Division of Real Estate
- Utah Division of Water Quality
- Utah Division of Wildlife Resources
