= Calvin Bird (politician) =

American politician

Member of the Utah House of Representatives from the 65th district
- In office January 1, 2003 – June 30, 2004
- Preceded by: Glenn Way
- Succeeded by: Aaron Tilton

Personal details
- Born: September 25, 1947 (age 78) Payson, Utah
- Party: Republican

Calvin Bird (born September 25, 1947) is an American politician who served in the Utah House of Representatives from the 65th district from 2003 to 2004.
