= Blake Townsend (politician) =

American politician

Member-elect of the Utah House of Representatives from the 36th district
- Assuming office January 1, 2027
- Succeeding: James Dunnigan

Personal details
- Party: Democratic
- Website: Campaign website

Blake Townsend is an American politician. A member of the Democratic Party, he is the member-elect for the 36th district of the Utah House of Representatives. He was elected at the 2026 election. He unseated incumbent Republican James Dunnigan. He is a labor organizer.
