= Eric Hutchings =

American politician

Speaker pro tempore of the Utah House of Representatives
- In office January 15, 2015 – January 1, 2021
- Preceded by: Jim Dunnigan
- Succeeded by: V. Lowry Snow

Member of the Utah House of Representatives from the 38th district
- In office August 22, 2001 – January 1, 2021
- Succeeded by: Ashlee Matthews

Personal details
- Party: Republican
- Education: Brigham Young University (BA)

Eric K. Hutchings is an American politician and a former Republican member of the Utah House of Representatives representing District 38. Hutchings had been in office for 20 years until January 2021 and was appointed by Utah Governor Mike Leavitt.

== Early life and career ==
Hutchings earned his BA in Asian studies from Brigham Young University. Hutchings lives in Kearns, Utah and is the CEO and founder of Regeneris Group Renewable Energy.

== Political career ==
- 2002 Hutchings was unopposed for the June 25, 2002 Republican primary and won the November 5, 2002 general election with 2,830 votes (60.4%) against Democratic nominee Brad Allen
- 2004 Hutchings was unopposed for the June 22, 2004 Republican primary and won the November 2, 2004 general election with 4,805 votes (58.7%) against Democratic nominee Chuck McDowell.
- 2006 Hutchings was unopposed for the 2006 Republican primary and won the three-way November 7, 2006 general election with 2,246 votes (51.4%) against returning 2004 Democratic opponent Chuck McDowell and Constitution candidate Kelly Wood.
- 2008 Hutchings was unopposed for the June 24, 2008 Republican primary and won the November 4, 2008 general election with 4,475 votes (56%) against Democratic nominee Charles Henderson.
- 2010 Hutchings was unopposed for both the June 22, 2010 Republican primary and the November 2, 2010 general election, winning with 3,899 votes.
- 2012 Hutchings was unopposed for the June 26, 2012 Republican primary and won the November 6, 2012 general election with 5,079 votes (58.3%) against Democratic nominee Elias McGraw.
- 2014 Hutchings was unopposed for the June 24, 2014 Republican primary and won the November 4, 2014 general election with 2,776 votes (58%) against Democratic nominee Chrystal Butterfield.

During the 2013-2016 legislative sessions, Hutchings served on the Executive Offices and Criminal Justice Appropriations Subcommittee. During the 2016 General Session, he also served on the House Education Committee and the House Revenue and Taxation Committee. During the interim, Hutchings serves on the Education Interim Committee and the Revenue and Taxation Interim Committee. In 2016 Hutchings held further roles in the Rural Development Legislative Liaison Committee and the Utah International Relations and Trade Commission.

== 2016 sponsored legislation ==
Bill number	Bill name	Bill status
HB0006S1	Executive Offices and Criminal Justice Base Budget	Governor Signed - 2/16/16
HB0259S1	Substance Abuse Treatment Fraud	House/ to Governor - 3/18/2016
HB0295	Obesity Report	Governor Signed - 3/21/2016
HB0297S1	Bail Bond Amendments	House/ filed - 3/10/2016
HB0366	Attorney General Amendments	House/ filed - 3/10/2016
HB0390	Law Enforcement Tracking Amendments	House/ filed - 3/10/2016
HB0396	Money Management Act Amendments	House/ filed - 3/10/2016
HB0462S1	Notaries Public Amendments	House/ filed - 3/10/2016
HB0465	Expungement Act Amendments	House/ filed - 3/10/2016
HB0480	Crime Victim Notification Amendments	House/ filed - 3/10/2016
HB0483	Spinal Cord and Brain Injury Rehabilitation Fund Amendments	House/ filed - 3/10/2016
HB0487S1	Criminal Code and Criminal Procedure Amendments	House/ filed - 3/10/2016
HJR015	Utah Athletic Foundation Joint Resolution	House/ filed - 3/10/2016

Hutchings also floor sponsored SB0011S01 Cancellation of Auto Insurance Coverage, SB0108S01 Birthing Center Amendments, SB0123S01 Office of Licensing Amendments, SB0137 County Option Funding for Botanical, Cultural, Recreational, and Zoological Organizations and Facilities, SB0150S02 Metro Township Amendments, SB0152 Accelerated Foreign Language Course Amendments, SB0189 Death Penalty Amendments, and SB0202 Pre-trial Release Amendments.

Utah House of Representatives
Preceded by Jim Dunnigan	Speaker pro tempore of the Utah House of Representatives; 2015–2021	Succeeded by V. Lowry Snow
