= National Hispanic Caucus of State Legislators =

- Formation: 1989
- Type: 501(c)(3) organization
- Headquarters: Washington, D.C. United States
- Members: Over 450 Hispanic State Legislators in the United States
- President: Representative Angela Romero (UT)
- Key people: Representative Juan Candelaria (CT), President-Elect Kenneth Romero, Executive Director
- Website: www.nhcsl.org

The National Hispanic Caucus of State Legislators (NHCSL) is a non-partisan 501(c)(3) nonprofit organization founded in 1989 by then Colorado State Senator, Larry Trujillo. NHCSL represents over 450 elected Hispanic State legislators throughout the United States, Puerto Rico and the Virgin Islands. Since its founding, the NHCSL's primary mission has been development of policies and procedures that enhance quality of life for Hispanic Communities across the country.

NHCSL works on behalf of State Legislators with Congress, the White House and the national advocacy groups.

The NHCSL is an organization serving and representing the interests of Hispanic state legislators from all states, commonwealths, and territories of the United States. The organization's mission is to serve as a catalyst for joint action on issues of common concern to all segments of the Hispanic community; a forum for information exchange and member networking; an institute for leadership training; a liaison with sister U.S. Hispanic organizations throughout the country; a promoter of public/private partnerships with business and labor; and a partner with Hispanic state or provincial legislators and their associations representing Central and South America.

== NHCSL leadership 2024-2025 ==
- President: Representative Angela Romero (UT)
- President-Elect: Representative Juan Candelaria (UT)
- Immediate Past President: Senator Nellie Pou (NJ)
- Vice President for Membership: Representative Victoria Neave (TX)
- Vice President for Public Policy: Senator Cristina Castro (IL)
- Secretary: Representative Lillian Ortiz-Self (WA)
- Treasurer: Representative Angel Matos (PR)
- East Region Chair: Assemblywoman Jessica Gonzalez-Rojas (NY)
- Midwest Region Chair: Senator Celina Villanueva (IL)
- South Region Chair: Senator Jason Esteves (GA)
- West Region Chair: Representative Marcelino Quiñonez (AZ)

In addition to the leadership team, NHCSL is governed by a 17-member executive committee.

== NHCSL staff ==
- Kenneth Romero, Executive Director
- Guillermo L. Mena-Irizarry, Director of Legislation, Policy and Advocacy
- Gabriela Benazar Acosta, Director of Communications
- Carolina García, Director of Meetings and Membership Services
