= Anthony Loubet =

American attorney and politician

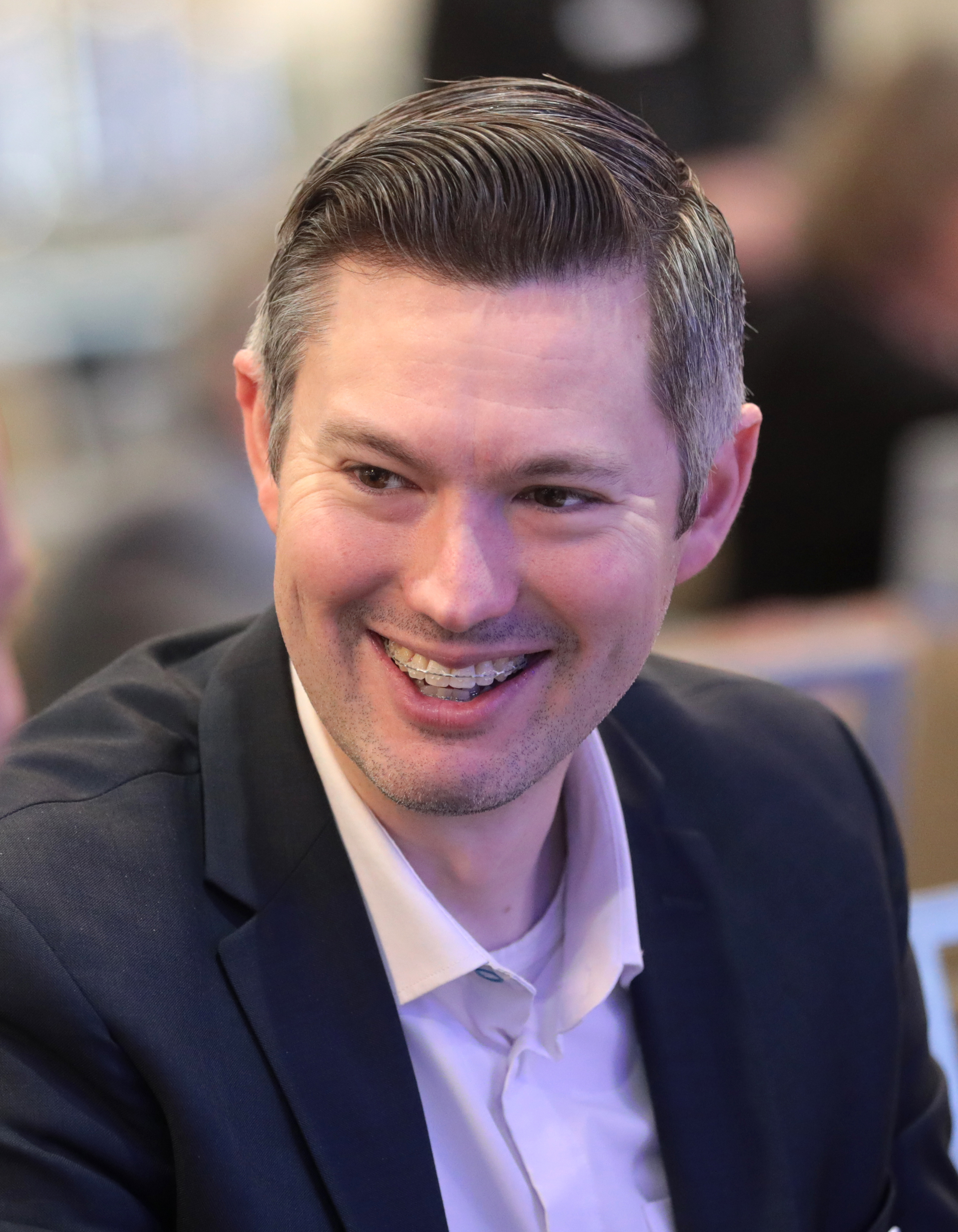

Member of the Utah House of Representatives from the 27th district
- Incumbent
- Assumed office January 1, 2023
- Preceded by: Clare Collard (Redistricting)
- Succeeded by: Liz Oates (elect)

Personal details
- Party: Republican
- Children: 6
- Education: Moorpark College (AA); California Lutheran University (BS); Brigham Young University (JD)

Anthony E. Loubet is an American attorney and politician serving as a member of the Utah House of Representatives for the 27th district. Elected in November 2022, he assumed office on January 1, 2023.

== Early life and education ==
Anthony is a native of Moorpark, California. His father immigrated to the United States from Mazatlán, Mexico. While earning an associate degree in liberal arts from Moorpark College, Anthony labored as a pest control technician at Ventura Pest Control. Although highly allergic to bees, with great assistance, Anthony regularly volunteered to eradicate and remove africanized and feral bee hives from the homes of Ventura & Los Angeles county residents. He earned a Bachelor of Science degree in business management from California Lutheran University, and a Juris Doctor from the J. Reuben Clark Law School at Brigham Young University.

== Career ==
After earning his bachelor's degree, Loubet worked as an advisor associate at Waddell & Reed in Thousand Oaks, California. From 2009 to 2013, he operated and independent tax consulting service. In 2018, Loubet served as a law clerk for Utah Appeals Court Judge Kate A. Toomey. From 2018 to 2021, he served as a deputy county attorney in the Utah County Attorney's Office. In 2021 and 2022, Loubet served as a senior policy advisor for Salt Lake County Councilman David Alvord. He works as the general counsel of the Abby Lou Foundation and Residential Habilitation Experts. Loubet was elected to the Utah House of Representatives in November 2022.
