= Aaron Tilton =

American politician

Member of the Utah House of Representatives from the 65th district
- In office July 15, 2004 – December 31, 2008
- Preceded by: Calvin Bird
- Succeeded by: Francis Gibson

Personal details
- Born: February 23, 1972 (age 54)
- Party: Republican

Aaron Tilton (born February 23, 1972) is an American politician who served in the Utah House of Representatives from the 65th district from 2004 to 2008.
