= Sergio Sotelo =

American politician

Member-elect of the Utah House of Representatives from the 38th district
- Assuming office January 2027
- Succeeding: Cheryl Acton

Personal details
- Party: Independent

Sergio Sotelo is an American politician. An independent, he is the member-elect for the 38th district of the Utah House of Representatives.
