= Stephen Otterstrom =

American politician

Member-elect of the Utah House of Representatives from the 21st district
- Assuming office January 1, 2027
- Succeeding: Sandra Hollins

Personal details
- Party: Democratic
- Website: Campaign website

Stephen Otterstrom is an American politician. A member of the Democratic Party, he is the member-elect for the 21st district of the Utah House of Representatives. He was elected at the 2026 election. He ran for a seat on the Salt Lake City Council in 2025.
