= Mike Schultz (politician) =

American politician

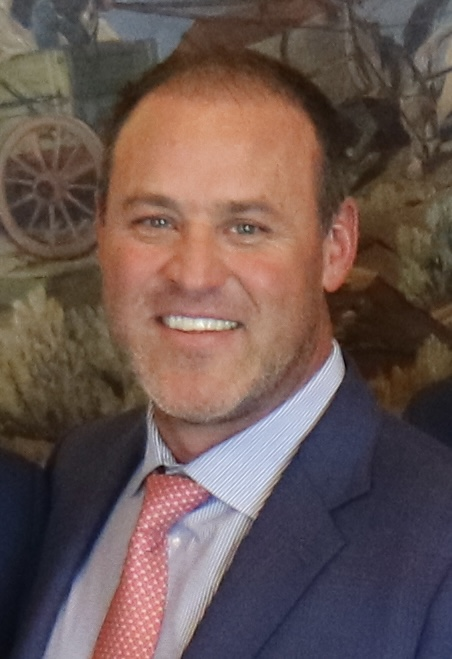
- Schultz in September 2024

Speaker of the Utah House of Representatives
- Incumbent
- Assumed office November 15, 2023
- Preceded by: Brad Wilson

Majority Leader of the Utah House of Representatives
- In office November 9, 2021 – November 15, 2023
- Preceded by: Francis Gibson
- Succeeded by: Jefferson Moss

Member of the Utah House of Representatives from the 12th district
- Incumbent
- Assumed office January 1, 2015
- Preceded by: Richard A. Greenwood

Personal details
- Born: Hooper, Utah, U.S.
- Party: Republican
- Spouse: Melissa
- Children: 6
- Education: Roy High School
- Website: house.utleg.gov/rep/SCHULM/

Mike Schultz is an American politician from Utah. He is a Republican member of the Utah State House, representing the state's 12th House district. He currently serves as the Speaker of the House, a position he has held since November 15, 2023, when his predecessor in that office, Brad Wilson, resigned. He previously served as majority leader, succeeding Francis Gibson.

== Early life and career ==
A lifelong resident of Hooper, Roy and West Haven, Schultz grew up working on his grandfather's cattle farm. An entrepreneur, he went on to obtain his general contractor's license and started building homes at age 20. He is now a real estate developer and the president of Castle Creek Homes. He worked with his good friend Michael Hall.

== Political career ==
Schultz was first elected to the Utah House of Representatives in 2014 and began serving on January 1, 2015. He is currently serving as House Speaker.

Rep. Schultz currently serves on the Business, Economic Development, and Labor Appropriations Subcommittee, Executive Appropriations Committee, House Education Committee, House Law Enforcement and Criminal Justice Committee, House Legislative Expense Oversight Committee, House Natural Resources, Agriculture, and Environment Committee, Legislative Audit Subcommittee, Legislative Audit Subcommittee, Subcommittee on Oversight.

=== Current legislation ===
2022 legislation
Bill	Status
HB0151 Retail Facility Incentive Payments Amendments	signed by the Governor 3/24/22
HB0155 Veteran Access to State Parks	signed by the Governor 3/22/22
HB0181 Railroad Crossing Maintenance Amendments	signed by the Governor 3/24/22
HB0405 Switcher Amendments	sent to House filing for bills not passed
HB0443 Utah Inland Port Authority Amendments	signed by the Governor 3/21/22

=== Controversial legislation ===
In 2018, Schultz co-sponsored SB136 with Wayne Harper which was signed into law. Among other provisions, SB136 includes an additional annual registration fee of up to $120 on clean air vehicles. The additional fees were opposed by air quality advocates such as the nonprofits Breathe Utah and Utah Clean Energy, which have stated the fees are misguided. Clean air advocates have voiced concerns that the additional fees will slow electric vehicle adoption and promote poorer air quality in Utah.

== Elections ==
- 2014: Schultz challenged incumbent Richard Greenwood for the Republican nomination, eventually winning when Greenwood dropped out. He faced Democrat Joseph Marrero in the general election, winning with 4,118 votes (75.9%) to Marrero's 1,308 votes (24.1%).

Utah House of Representatives
Preceded by Francis Gibson	Majority Leader of the Utah House of Representatives; 2021–2023	Succeeded by Jefferson Moss
Political offices
Preceded by Brad Wilson	Speaker of the Utah House of Representatives; 2023–present	Incumbent
