= Earl Tanner =

American politician (born 1950)

Member of the Utah House of Representatives from the 43rd district
- In office January 2013 – January 2017
- Preceded by: Wayne Harper
- Succeeded by: Adam Gardiner

Personal details
- Born: February 20, 1950 (age 76) Salt Lake City, Utah
- Party: Republican
- Education: University of Utah
- Profession: Lawyer
- Website: tannerforhouse.com

Military service
- Branch/service: Utah National Guard
- Years of service: 1969–1976
- Unit: 19th Special Forces Group

Earl D. Tanner (born February 20, 1950) is an American politician and a former Republican member of the Utah House of Representatives. He represented District 43 from January 2013 through January 2017.

== Early life and education ==
Tanner was born and raised in the Salt Lake Valley, the oldest of the six children of Earl D. Tanner and Mary Louise Lyon. He graduated from Skyline High School in 1968, then got a degree in mathematics from the University of Utah in 1971. Tanner served an LDS mission in the Philippines before entering law school at the University of Utah. He began practicing law with his father in 1976. He served in the Utah National Guard as a member of the 19th Special Forces Group.

He moved to West Jordan in 1978.

== Political career ==
Tanner was first elected on November 6, 2012. During the 2016 legislative session, he served on the House Law Enforcement and Criminal Justice Committee and the House Public Utilities and Technology Committee.

== 2016 sponsored legislation ==
Bill Number	Bill Title	Status
HB0111	Domestic Asset Protection Trust Amendments	House/Filed - 3/10/2016
HB0323S03	Continuing Care Retirement Community Amendments	Governor Signed - 3/25/2016

Tanner did not floor sponsor any legislation during 2016.

== Elections ==
- 2012 When incumbent Republican Representative Wayne Harper ran for Utah State Senate, Tanner was chosen from among three candidates at the Republican convention and won the November 6, 2012 general election with 7,113 votes (60.1%) against Democratic nominee Jeff Bell.
- 2014 Tanner was unopposed for the 2012 Republican convention and won the November 4, 2014 general election with 3,968 votes (57.5%) against Democratic nominee Diane Lewis.
