= Brad Wilson (politician) =

American politician (born 1969)

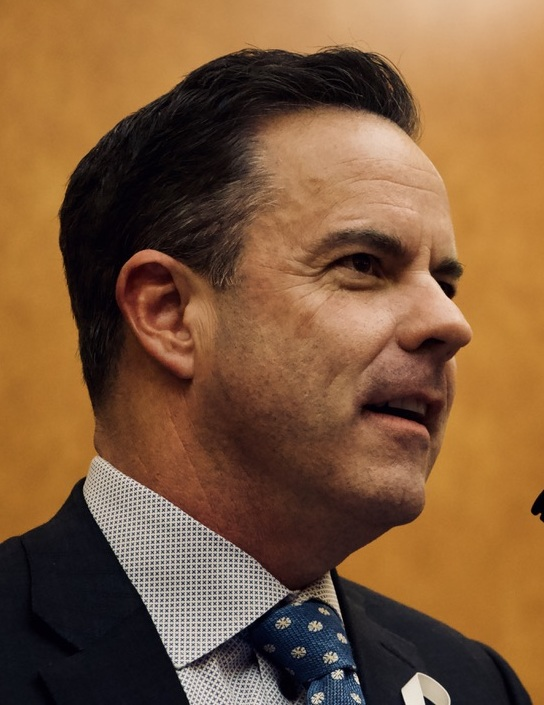

Speaker of the Utah House of Representatives
- In office January 28, 2019 – November 15, 2023
- Preceded by: Greg Hughes
- Succeeded by: Mike Schultz

Majority Leader of the Utah House of Representatives
- In office January 23, 2017 – January 28, 2019
- Preceded by: James Dunnigan
- Succeeded by: Francis Gibson

Member of the Utah House of Representatives from the 15th district
- In office January 1, 2011 – November 15, 2023
- Preceded by: Douglas C. Aagard
- Succeeded by: Ariel Defay

Personal details
- Born: January 29, 1969 (age 57) Layton, Utah, U.S.
- Party: Republican
- Education: Weber State University (BA)
- Website: Campaign website

Bradley R. Wilson is an American real estate developer and Republican politician. Wilson is a former member of the Utah House of Representatives, representing District 15. He served as the House Speaker from 2019 to 2023. On April 13, 2023, he formed an exploratory committee to run for the U.S. Senate in 2024.

== Personal life and education ==
Wilson was born on January 29, 1969, in Layton, Utah. As one of ten children, Wilson was expected to work from a young age. He held several jobs before graduating high school. Wilson earned his BA in business administration from Weber State University in 1992.

Wilson is the CEO of Newtown Development, a multi-family residential community developer in Utah. Prior to working for Newtown Development, Wilson was president and CEO of Destination Homes, a residential homebuilder. Prior to working for Destination Homes, Wilson was vice president with American Express Financial Advisors with responsibility for Utah operations.

He lives in Kaysville, Utah, with his wife and their three children.

== Utah House of Representatives ==
Wilson first ran for office in 2010 when District 15 incumbent Republican Representative Douglas C. Aagard resigned from the State Legislature and left the seat open. Wilson was one of two candidates from among four chosen by the Republican convention for the June 22, 2010 Republican primary, winning with 1,727 votes (45.2%) and won the November 2, 2010 general election with 7,794 votes (81.2%) against Democratic candidate Sherri Tatton. During the 2022 legislative session, he served on the Executive Appropriations Committee, House Legislative Expense Oversight Committee, Legislative Audit Subcommittee, Legislative Management Committee, Subcommittee on Oversight.

In the 2022 General Session, Speaker Wilson sponsored the Great Salt Lake Watershed Enhancement. This legislation is to enact the preservation and rescue of the Great Salt Lake. In addition to sponsoring this bill, Speaker Wilson also cosponsored 8 bills during the session.

Wilson was the first state representative to be unanimously elected House Speaker twice.

In September 2023 Wilson announced that he would resign from the Utah House of Representatives. He officially resigned on November 15, 2023.

== 2024 U.S. Senate election in Utah ==
Wilson became the first candidate to announce his intentions to challenge incumbent Senator Mitt Romney when he announced his Senate exploratory committee in April 2023. In July 2023, Wilson told Fox News Digital he has raised more than $2.2 million, $1.2 million of which was personal contribution and $1,018,586 from various donors in the last three months — with 94% of those donations coming from Utah residents. He officially announced his candidacy at his first campaign rally in Draper on September 27, 2023.

He is endorsed by Utah Governor Spencer Cox, over 60 State Legislators, 21 County Commissioners, 61 City Mayors, and 22 Utah Sheriffs (over 3/4ths of the state’s sheriffs).

At the Utah state Republican convention on April 27, Wilson was eliminated with 4.68% of the vote in the third of four rounds of voting, with Trent Staggs becoming the Party's official sole nominee from convention. He continued with other signature gathering candidates to a four-way primary in June.

== Political positions ==
Wilson supports term limits for members of Congress. He signed the "US Term Limits Pledge" while explaining that "American's Founding Fathers envisioned citizen legislators - they never intended to have a career class of professional politicians running America."

Wilson presented a motion in December 2020 to not give Salt Lake City school teachers the Covid-19 bonus of $1500 until their school districts agreed to resume in-person classes.

Utah House of Representatives
Preceded by James Dunnigan	Majority Leader of the Utah House of Representatives; 2017–2019	Succeeded by Francis Gibson
Political offices
Preceded by Greg Hughes	Speaker of the Utah House of Representatives; 2019–2023	Succeeded by Mike Schultz
