= Brian King (politician) =

American politician (born 1959)

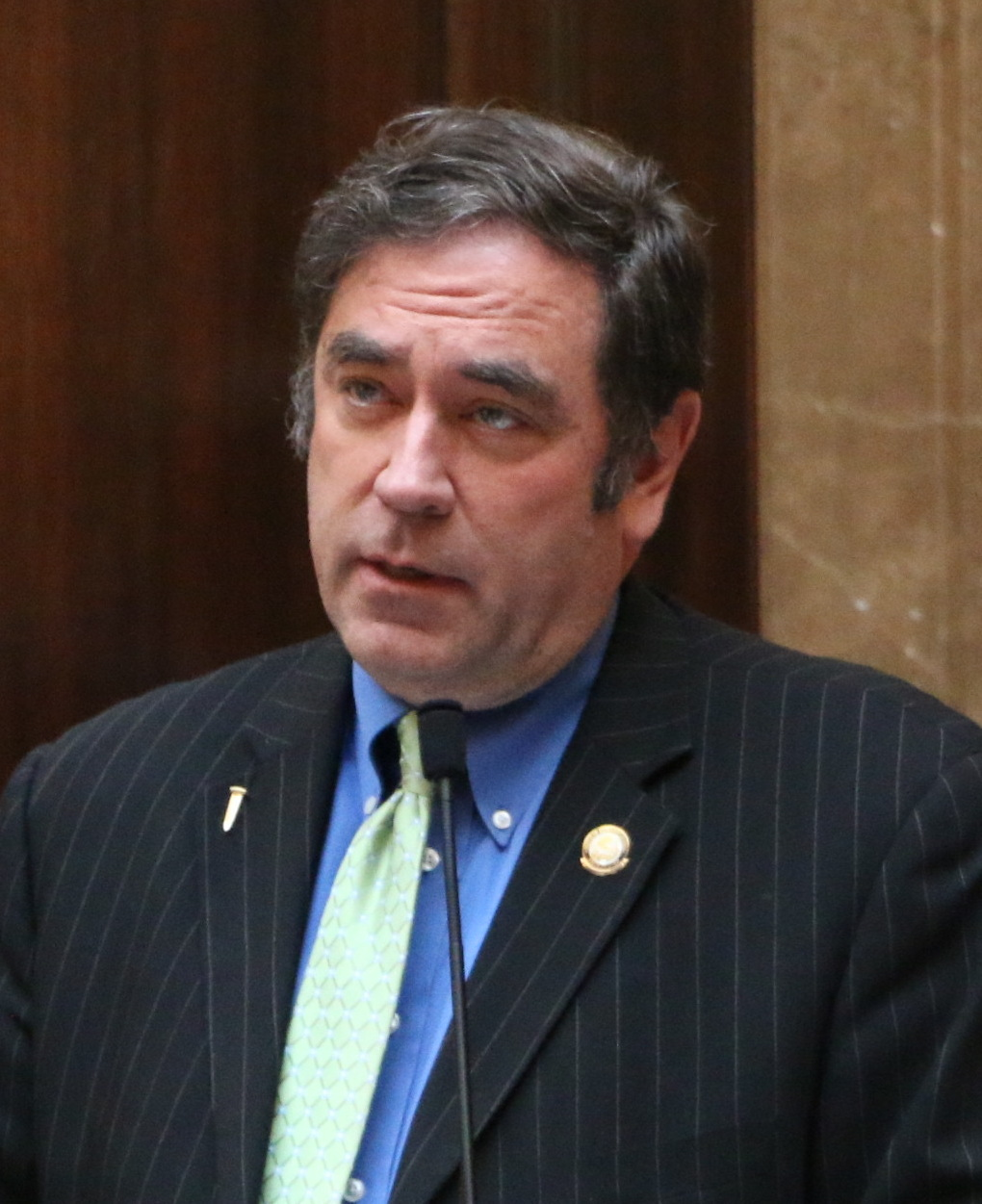
- King in 2018

Chair of the Utah Democratic Party
- Incumbent
- Assumed office May 31, 2025
- Preceded by: Diane Lewis

Minority Leader of the Utah House of Representatives
- In office January 26, 2015 – January 17, 2023
- Preceded by: Jen Seelig
- Succeeded by: Angela Romero

Member of the Utah House of Representatives
- In office January 1, 2009 – December 31, 2024
- Preceded by: Roz McGee
- Succeeded by: Hoang Nguyen
- Constituency: 28th district (2009–2023); 23rd district (2023–2024)

Personal details
- Born: Brian Smith King; August 19, 1959 (age 67)
- Party: Democratic
- Spouse: Ann Silverberg (m. 2022)
- Children: 4
- Education: University of Utah (BS, JD)

Brian Smith King (born August 19, 1959) is an American politician who has served as the chair of the Utah Democratic Party since 2025. He served as a Democratic member of the Utah House of Representatives from the 23rd district. Before redistricting following the 2020 census, he represented the 28th district since January 1, 2009. In April 2024, he became the Democratic nominee for gubernatorial election, running against Republican incumbent Spencer Cox.

== Education ==
King earned a Bachelor of Science degree in economics from the University of Utah and a Juris Doctor from the S.J. Quinney College of Law.

== Career ==
Prior to and concurrent with his legislative service, King practiced law as a self-employed attorney with a specialization in civil litigation under the Employee Retirement Income Security Act (ERISA) and the Mental Health Parity and Addiction Equity Act (MHPAEA). He has spoken prominently on the positive benefits of residential treatment centers in addressing mental health problem in youth.

King served as president of the Utah Association for Justice (formerly the Utah Trial Lawyers Association), a professional organization representing civil trial attorneys in the state.

=== Utah Legislature ===
In 2008, when Representative Roz McGee left the Legislature and left the seat open, King was unopposed after an opponent withdrew, and won the three-way November 4, 2008 general election with 8,487 votes (56.2%) against Republican nominee Jeffrey Morrow and Constitution candidate Jared Beck, who had run for Utah State Senate in 2006.

==== House minority leader ====
King had the reputation as being "more combative" than previous minority leaders in the State House of Representatives. In 2016, King criticized Republican leadership of the House for what was described as "shut(ing) out Democrats from discussions about whether to expand Medicaid for the poor." He was succeeded in 2023 by Angela Romero.

==== Committee assignments ====
During the 2016 legislative session, King served on the Executive Appropriations Committee, the Executive Offices and Criminal Justice Appropriations Subcommittee, the House Judiciary Committee, the House Revenue and Taxation Committee, and the House Rules Committee. He also served as the House minority leader. In the 2022 legislative session, King served on the Executive Appropriations Committee, the Federalism Commission, the House Business and Labor Committee, the House Judiciary Committee, the House Legislative Expense Oversight Committee, the Legislative Audit Subcommittee, the Legislative Management Committee, Natural Resources, Agriculture, and Environmental Quality Appropriations Subcommittee, and the Subcommittee on Oversight.

==== Gun policy ====
Throughout his career, King has sponsored gun control legislation. In 2019, King sponsored HB 148, "Universal Background Checks for Firearm Purchasers" that would require background checks for all gun sales, but it was not given a committee vote. In 2020, King sponsored his and it was tabled by the House Law Enforcement and Criminal Justice Committee by an 8–3 vote. In 2022, King sponsored a modified version of the bill previously sponsored, which would require background checks for all non-federal firearms licensees, law enforcement agencies and officers and family members as exceptions. The House Law Enforcement and Criminal Justice Committee rejected the bill on an 8–3 vote.

=== Chair of the Utah Democratic Party ===
On May 31, 2025, King was elected chair of the Utah Democratic Party, defeating campaign consultant Ben Peck with 52% of the vote.

== Elections ==
- 2020: King was unopposed in the Democratic primary, but faced Republican challenger Carol Hunter in the general election. King won the race with 71.9% of the vote.
- 2018: King was unopposed in the Democratic primary and general election, winning with 16,494 votes (100%).
- 2016: King was unopposed in the Democratic primary and general election.
- 2014: King was unopposed in the Democratic primary and general election, winning with 9,960 votes (100%).
- 2012: King was unopposed for the June 26, 2012 Democratic primary and won the November 6, 2012 general election with 12,530 votes (67.2%) against Republican nominee Rick Raile, who had run for a House seat in 2010.
- 2010: King was unopposed for the June 22, 2010 Democratic primary and won the November 2, 2010 general election with 6,703 votes (59.9%) against Republican nominee James Farley.

== Personal life ==
King lives in Salt Lake City and has four children. He is a member of the Church of Jesus Christ of Latter-day Saints and served a full-time mission in St. Louis, Missouri.

Utah House of Representatives
Preceded by Jen Seelig	Minority Leader of the Utah House of Representatives; 2015–2023	Succeeded by Angela Romero
Party political offices
Preceded by Christopher Peterson	Democratic nominee for Governor of Utah; 2024	Most recent
Preceded by Diane Lewis	Chair of the Utah Democratic Party; 2025–present	Incumbent
