= V. Lowry Snow =

American politician (born 1950)

Lowry Snow
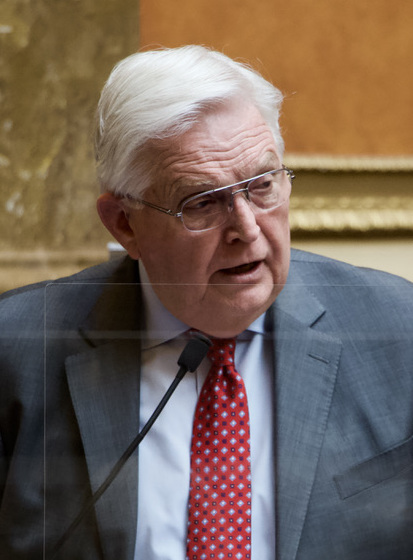

Speaker pro tempore of the Utah House of Representatives
- In office January 19, 2021 – December 31, 2022
- Preceded by: Eric Hutchings
- Succeeded by: James Dunnigan

Member of the Utah House of Representatives from the 74th district
- In office January 11, 2012 – December 31, 2022
- Preceded by: David Clark
- Succeeded by: Neil Walter

Personal details
- Born: August 21, 1950 (age 75) Salt Lake City, Utah, U.S.
- Party: Republican
- Education: Brigham Young University (BS); Gonzaga University (JD)
- Website: Official website

V. Lowry Snow (born August 21, 1950) is an American politician who served as a Republican member of the Utah House of Representatives, representing District 74 since his January 11, 2012 appointment to fill the vacancy caused by the resignation of David Clark. He has lived in Washington County for over 40 years and is married to former high school music educator, Sheryl Snow. They have been married for 47 years and have 6 children and 17 grandchildren. They currently reside in Santa Clara.

== Education ==
Snow earned his BS from Brigham Young University and his JD from Gonzaga University School of Law.

== Career ==
An attorney, Snow is one of the founding partners of Snow Jensen & Reece in St. George, where he has established himself as a real estate, civil litigation, business and land use planning attorney. He has represented a range of clients in the private and public sectors, including several municipalities. He is licensed to practice before the state courts of Utah and Federal District Court for Utah. He is also admitted to practice before the United States Supreme Court. He has been recognized multiple years as one of Utah Business magazine's Elite Lawyers and also has been recognized by Super Lawyer for the past five years consecutively. Lowry has an AV Preeminent peer rating of 5 out of 5, meaning he meets very high criteria of general ethical standards. For eight years, he served as a member of the Washington County Economic Development Council Executive Committee.

== Political career ==
Snow served as a board member of Governor's Office of Economic Development (GOED). He was appointed to the Legislature on January 1, 2011, and was last elected on November 4, 2014. While serving in the legislature, Lowry has successfully sponsored significant legislation dealing with education, criminal justice reform, protection of children and victims of abuse, water law, tax relief for citizens and protections for military veterans and the elderly.

The 2017 juvenile justice reform bill he sponsored was credited with helping to reduce the number of Utahn youth needing costly residential placements. The bill is also credited with improving disparities in the availability of community-based treatment programs for youth across the state.

During the 2022 General Session, Snow served on the Public Education Appropriations Subcommittee, House Education Committee, House Judiciary Committee, and the Utah Commission on Uniform State Laws.

One notable piece of legislation he worked on in his final General Session with the Utah House of Representatives was HB 147, Death Penalty Modifications, which prohibits the state from seeking the death penalty for aggravated murder committed after May 4, 2022. The bill ultimately did not pass in 2022 but may be revisited in a future session of the Legislature. Snow brought up three points three points with the committee that heard the bill: "No. 1, the death penalty is broken. No. 2, the death penalty unintentionally can cause more harm to victim (family) members. No. 3, maintaining the death penalty means we run the risk, in our state, of executing innocent people." Snow mentioned a 2018 report in the state that found, despite spending $40 million prosecuting death penalty cases in the last 20 years, the state only imposed two death sentences. "We have almost nothing to show for that," he said. "How much better would it be to redirect that to helping the victims and the victims’ families?"

== Personal life and achievements ==
Snow lives in St. George, Utah. During his life, Snow has served as chair of the Utah Judicial Performance Evaluation Commission; chair of the Washington county Economic Development Council; member of the Utah State GOED Board; chair of the Southern Utah Community Legal Center Advisory Board; member of the Kane County Hospital Foundation Board; member of the EDC of Utah Board; and board member of St. George Rotary. While Snow will not be an elected member of the Legislature after the 2022 General Session, he has said that he will not yet fully retire from his professional career.

== Elections ==
- In 2012, Snow was unopposed for the June 26, 2012 Republican Primary and won the November 6, 2012 General election with 12,435 votes (76.7%) against Democratic nominee Lee Ann Riddoch.
- In 2014, Snow was unopposed for the June Republican convention and won the November 4, 2014 General election with 7,229 votes (75.7%) against Democratic nominee Dorothy Engelman.
- In 2016, Snow ran unopposed an won as the incumbent of District 74.
- In 2018, Snow won 76.3% of the vote in District 74.
- In the most recent 2020 district election, Snow won 18,196 votes, approximately 73.4% of the vote, defeating challenger Kenzie Carter to claim the District 74 seat.
- In December of 2021, Representative Snow announced that he will not be seeking re-election for the coming term.

== 2022 sponsored legislation ==
Bill	Status
HB 42- Education Sunset Extensions	Governor signed 3/15/22
HB 120- Uniform Partition of Heirs' Property Act	Governor signed 3/24/22
HB 132- Uniform Easement Relocation Act	Governor signed 3/24/22
HB 147- Death Penalty Modifications	House/ filed 3/4/22
HB 179- Juvenile Record Amendments	House/ filed 3/4/22
HB 208- Domestic Violence Offender Treatment Board	Governor signed 3/22/22
HB 226- Higher Education and Corrections Council	Governor signed 3/22/22
HB 248- Juvenile Amendments	Governor signed 3/24/22
HB 249- Juvenile Recodification Cross References	Governor signed 3/24/22
HB 265- Charter School Agreements and Renewals	House/ filed 3/4/22
HB 299- Juvenile Justice Changes	Governor signed 3/22/22
HB 390- Early College and Concurrent Enrollment Program Amendments	Governor signed 3/24/22
HB 438- Point of the Mountain State Land Authority Amendments	Governor signed 3/23/22

Utah House of Representatives
Preceded by Eric Hutchings	Speaker pro tempore of the Utah House of Representatives; 2021–2022	Succeeded by James Dunnigan
