= Wayne Harper =

American politician (born 1956)

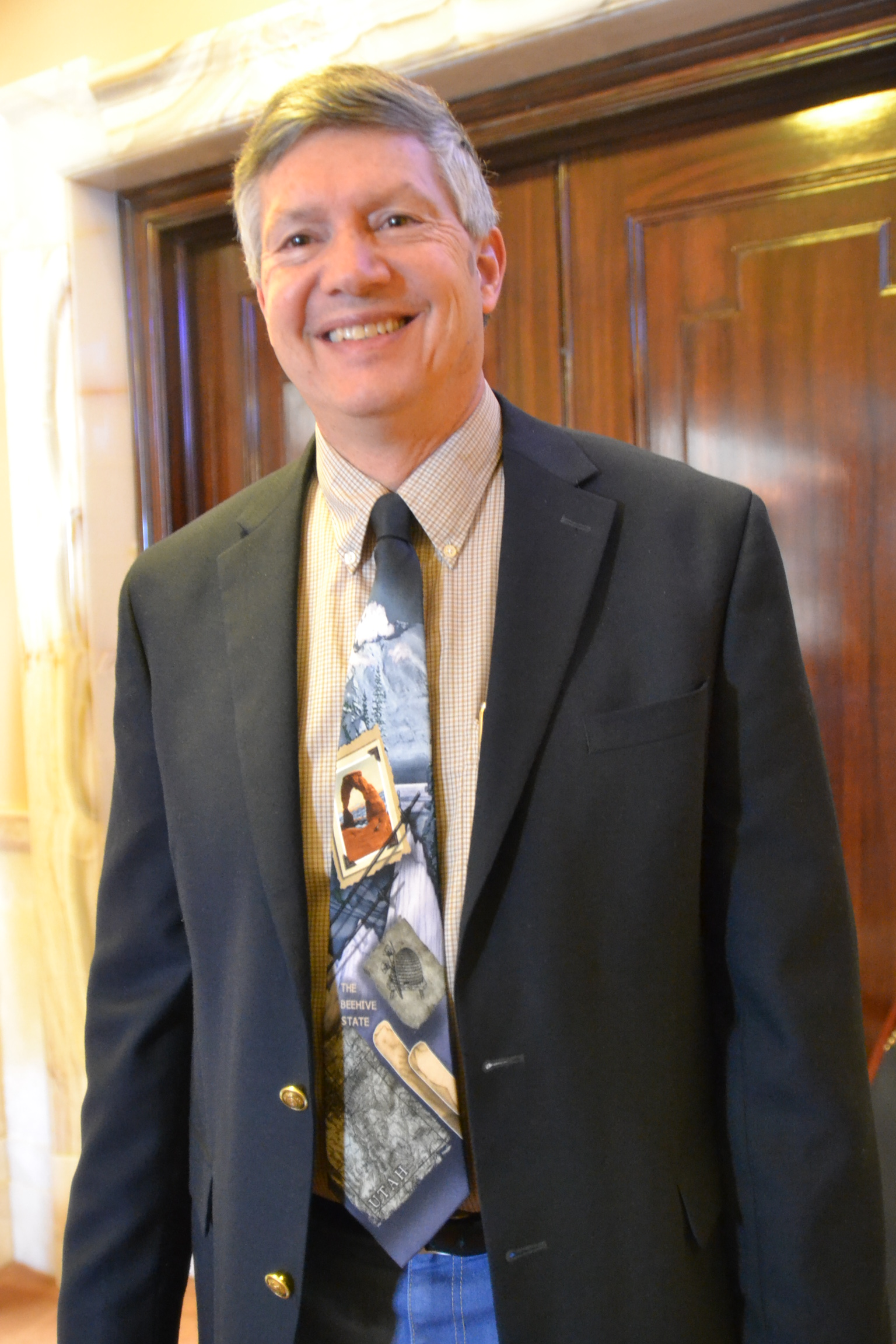
- Harper in February 2014

Member of the Utah Senate
- Incumbent
- Assumed office January 1, 2013
- Preceded by: Michael G. Waddoups
- Constituency: 6th district (2013–2023); 16th district (2023–present)

President of the National Conference of State Legislatures
- Incumbent
- Assumed office 2024
- Preceded by: Brian Patrick Kennedy

Member of the Utah House of Representatives from the 43rd district
- In office January 1, 1997 – December 31, 2012
- Succeeded by: Earl Tanner

Personal details
- Born: February 27, 1956 (age 70)
- Party: Republican
- Education: Brigham Young University

Wayne A. Harper (born February 27, 1956) is an American politician and a Republican member of the Utah State Senate representing District 16 since 2023. Prior to redistricting, he represented District 6 starting in 2013. from January 1, 1997, until December 31, 2012, Harper represented District 43 in the Utah House of Representatives

== Early life, education, and career ==
Harper earned his Bachelor of Arts in History and Master of Science from Brigham Young University. He is married to KaLee, and together they have eleven children. Harper is a Certified Archivist, Certified Real Estate Consultant, and Certified Real Estate Developer. He works as a Business and Economic Development Consultant, and for Taylorsville City. In his professional career, Harper has been affiliated with the Conference of Inter-Mountain Archivists, the International Economic Development Council, and the International Council of Shopping Centers. He resides in Taylorsville, Utah.

== Political career ==
Harper started his political career as a West Jordan City Councilman. He has also served as the President of the Streamline Sales Tax Governing Board and on the Utah State Historical Records Advisory Board, Utah State Capitol Preservation Board, and Utah Alliance for Economic Development. Harper served in the House of Representatives from 1997–2012, and was elected to the Utah Senate in 2012. During the 2016 Legislative Session, Harper served on the following committees:

- Business, Economic Development, and Labor Appropriations Subcommittee
- Infrastructure and General Government Appropriations Subcommittee (Senate Chair)
- Senate Revenue and Taxation Committee
- Senate Transportation and Public Utilities and Technology Committee

In 2024, he became president of the National Conference of State Legislatures.

== Elections ==
In 2012 when Senate District 6 Republican Senator Michael G. Waddoups left the Legislature and left the seat open, Harper was selected from two candidates by the Republican convention for the November 6, 2012, General election, which he won with 28,073 votes (83%) against Democratic nominee John Rendell, who had run for Legislative seats in 2008 and 2010.

=== Election results history ===
2024 Utah State Senate election District 16
Party	Candidate	Votes	%
Republican	Wayne Harper	24,923	57.5%
Independent	Monnica Manuel	18,447	42.5%
Total votes		43,370	100%

2020 Utah State Senate election District 6
Party	Candidate	Votes	%
Republican	Wayne Harper	23,525	55.6%
Democratic	Erika Larsen	18,774	44.4%
Total votes		42,299	100%

2016 Utah State Senate election District 6
Party	Candidate	Votes	%
Republican	Wayne Harper	19,325	56.4%
Democratic	Celina Milner	12,682	37.0%
Libertarian	Jim Dexter	2,266	6.6%
Total votes		34,273	100%

2012 Utah State Senate election District 6
Party	Candidate	Votes	%
Republican	Wayne Harper	19,961	60.5%
Democratic	John Rendell	13,049	39.5%

2010 Utah State House of Representatives election District 43
Party	Candidate	Votes	%
Republican	Wayne Harper	4,802	62.4%
Democratic	Brian Yardley	2,559	33.3%
Constitution	D. Mark Faux	334	4.3%
Total votes		7,695	100%

2008 Utah State House of Representatives election District 43
Party	Candidate	Votes	%
Republican	Wayne Harper	6,432	57.3%
Democratic	Brian Yardley	4,794	42.7%
	write-in	15	0.1%
Total votes		11,226	100%

2006 Utah State House of Representatives election District 43
Party	Candidate	Votes	%
Republican	Wayne A. Harper	4,538	72.8%
Constitution	Barbara J. Neville	1,183	19.0%
Green	Tom King	448	7.8%
	write-in	24	0.2%
Total votes		12,135	100%

2004 Utah State House of Representatives election District 43
Party	Candidate	Votes	%
Republican	Wayne A. Harper	4,912	82.8%
Green	Tom King	1,003	9.8%
Libertarian	D. Mark Faux	768	7.5%
Total votes		12,135	100%

2002 Utah State House of Representatives election District 43
Party	Candidate	Votes	%
Republican	Wayne Harper	4,062	57.7%
Democratic	James Bramble	2,698	38.3%
Libertarian	D. Mark Faux	161	2.3%
Total votes		7,209	100%

2000 Utah State House of Representatives election District 43
Party	Candidate	Votes	%
Republican	Wayne Harper	4,772	58.7%
Democratic	Tanya Henrie	3,361	41.3%
Total votes		8,525	100%

1998 Utah State House of Representatives election District 43
Party	Candidate	Votes	%
Republican	Wayne A. Harper	3,021	55.9%
Democratic	Mary K. Hammond	2,380	44.1%
Total votes		5,401	100%

== Legislation ==
=== 2016 sponsored bills ===
Bill number and Title	Status of Bill
S.B. 6 Infrastructure and General Government Base Budget	Governor Signed 2/16/2016
S.B. 11 Cancellation of Auto Insurance Coverage	Governor Signed 3/21/2016
S.B. 22 Foreclosure of Residential Rental Property	Governor Signed 3/28/2016
S.B. 31 Tax Commission Levy Process	Governor Signed 3/28/2016
S.B. 65 Sales and Use Tax Reporting Requirements	Senate/Filed for bills not passed 3/10/2016
S.B. 68 Property Tax Amendments	Governor Signed 3/28/2016
S.B. 74 Aviation Amendments	Governor Signed 3/28/2016
S.B. 82 Child Welfare Modifications	Governor Signed 3/23/2016
S.B. 86 Sales and Use Tax Compliance Amendments	Senate/Filed for bills not passed 3/10/2016
S.B. 135 Administrative Law Judge Amendments	Governor Signed 3/23/2016
S.B. 151 Community Development and Renewal Agencies Act Revisions	Governor Signed 3/28/2016
S.B. 158 Juvenile Court and Child Abuse Amendments	Governor Signed 3/28/2016
S.B. 160 Federal Funds Budget Reserve Account	Senate/Filed for bills not passed 3/10/2016
S.B. 182 Sales and Use Tax Revisions	Senate/Filed for bills not passed 3/10/2016
S.B. 193 Utah Communications Authority Act Amendments	Governor Signed 3/22/2016
S.B 210 Unmanned Vehicle Revisions	Senate/Filed for bills not passed 3/10/2016
S.B. 220 Non Judicial Foreclosure Amendments	Governor Signed 3/25/2016
S.C.R. 2 Concurrent Resolution in Support of Sales and Use Tax Transactional Equity	Governor Signed 3/17/2016
S.J.R. 3 Proposal to Amend Utah Constitution-Property Tax Exemptions	Senate/To Lieutenant Governor 3/16/2016

=== Notable legislation ===
In 2016 Senator Harper passed Senate Bill 210, which outlines and regulates the use of recreational drones in Utah. The law also gives local police the authority to shoot down drones if they are not in compliance with the law, and if being shot down does not pose a threat to people or animals. This bill does not apply to commercial drones.

=== Controversial legislation ===
In 2018 Harper sponsored SB136 which was signed into law. Among other provisions, SB136 includes an additional annual registration fee of up to $120 on clean air vehicles. The additional fees were opposed by air quality advocates such as the nonprofits Breathe Utah, and Utah Clean Energy which has stated the fees are misguided. Clean air advocates have voiced concerns that the additional fees will slow electric vehicle adoption and promote poorer air quality in Utah. There are an estimated 1,000–2,000 deaths in Utah annually due to poor air quality, and emissions from gasoline and diesel powered vehicles, are the primary cause of pollution.

In 2021 Harper sponsored HB209 to increase EV fees in Utah to $300 annually in addition to normal registration costs. HB209 did not pass. In 2023 Harper sponsored HB301, which passed, and will levy a tax of 12.5% on electricity at EV charging stations. This adds a third tax at charging stations in Utah on top of existing sales and franchise taxes, and some analyses estimate some EV owners will pay twice as much tax as gasoline fueled vehicle drivers.

In February 2025, Harper introduced SB195, which removed Salt Lake City's authority to plan its own streets. In support of the bill, Harper cited a paper critical of the city's safe streets initiative that was reportedly largely AI-generated.
