= Adam Gardiner (politician) =

American politician

Member of the Utah House of Representatives from the 43rd district
- In office January 2017 – August 2017
- Preceded by: Earl Tanner
- Succeeded by: Cheryl Acton

Personal details
- Party: Republican

Adam Gardiner is a former member of the Utah State legislature and Salt Lake County recorder who in December 2018 was appointed as Utah affairs director on the staff of Senator-elect Mitt Romney.

== Career ==
Gardiner is a Republican. He displaced his predecessor Earl Tanner at the 2016 Republican State convention. He was in the Utah State House of Representatives from January 2017 until August 2017.

Gardiner is a member of The Church of Jesus Christ of Latter-day Saints. He is married and the father of two children. He earned a bachelor's degree in political science and communications from Weber State University.

Early in his career Gardiner worked as an aid for Doug Aagard of the Utah House of Representatives in 2008. In 2010, he was the campaign manager for Rob Bishop's campaign to be reelected to the US House from a district in Utah. He then worked as an aid to Bishop until 2014. In 2014, he became a senior policy advisor working for Salt Lake County.

In August 2017, Gardiner resigned from the Utah Legislature to become Salt Lake County recorder. In November 2018, Gardiner lost the election for county recorder to Rachelle Hobbs.

In December 2018, Romney picked Gardiner to run his Utah office.

== Sources ==
- Ballotpedia entry on Gardiner
- Vote Smart entry on Gardiner
