= Clare Collard =

American politician

Member of the Utah House of Representatives from the 22nd district
- In office January 1, 2021 – December 31, 2022
- Preceded by: Susan Duckworth
- Succeeded by: Anthony Loubet (Redistricting)

Personal details
- Party: Democratic

Clare Collard is an American politician who served as a member of the Utah House of Representatives from the 22nd district from January 1, 2021, to December 31, 2022.

== Education and career ==
Collard attended the University of Strathclyde and University of California, Irvine.

== Career ==
Collard works as a business services manager and lives in Magna.

Collard, a member of the Magna township planning commission, was elected to Utah House District 22 in November 2020, replacing retired Rep. Susan Duckworth. Collard defeated Republican Anthony Loubet.

For 2021, she was appointed to the public utilities and technology committee, and the economic development and workforce services committee.

In November 2022, she lost her bid for reelection, losing the rematch to Anthony Loubet by just 67 votes in the newly re-drawn district.

At the 2024 Utah State Democratic Convention, she was elected by the delegates to represent Utah on the Democratic National Committee.
