= Sandra Hollins =

American politician

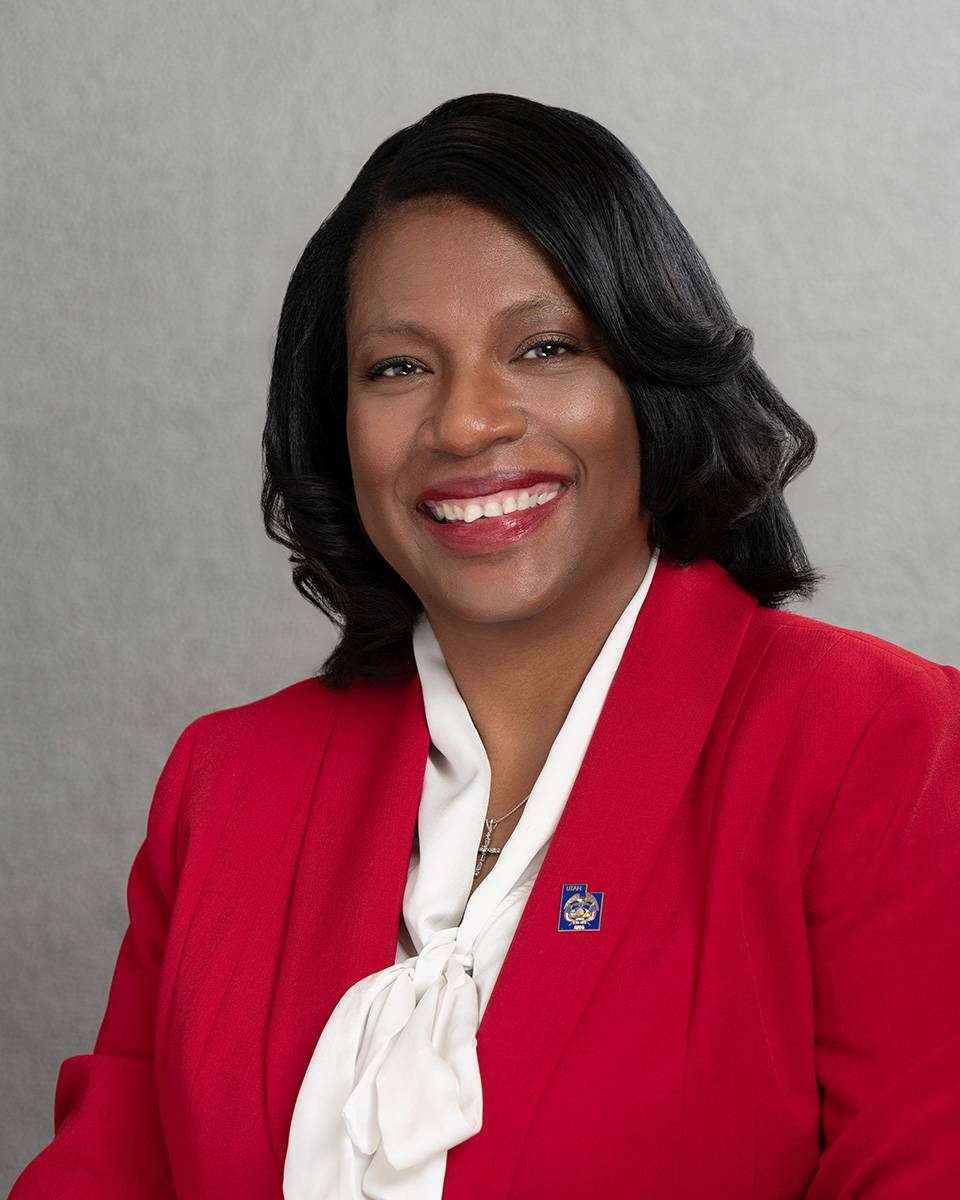

Member of the Utah House of Representatives
- Incumbent
- Assumed office January 1, 2015
- Preceded by: Jen Seelig
- Succeeded by: Stephen Otterstrom (elect)
- Constituency: 23rd district (2015–2023); 21st district (2023–present)

Personal details
- Party: Democratic
- Education: University of Phoenix (BS); University of Utah (MSW)

Sandra Hollins is an American politician serving as a member of the Utah State House of Representatives and represents House District 21. Hollins is the first African-American woman to serve in the Utah State Legislature.

== Early life and education ==
A native of Louisiana, Hollins is a graduate of McDonogh 35 College Preparatory Charter High School in New Orleans. She received a Bachelor of Science degree in business management from the University of Phoenix and a Masters in Social Work from the University of Utah.

== Career ==
Hollins has served as a member of the Utah House of Representatives since 2015. She ran for office in 2014 and defeated Republican candidate Kristopher Smith. Hollis serves as vice chair of the House Ethics Committee.
