= Angela Romero =

American politician

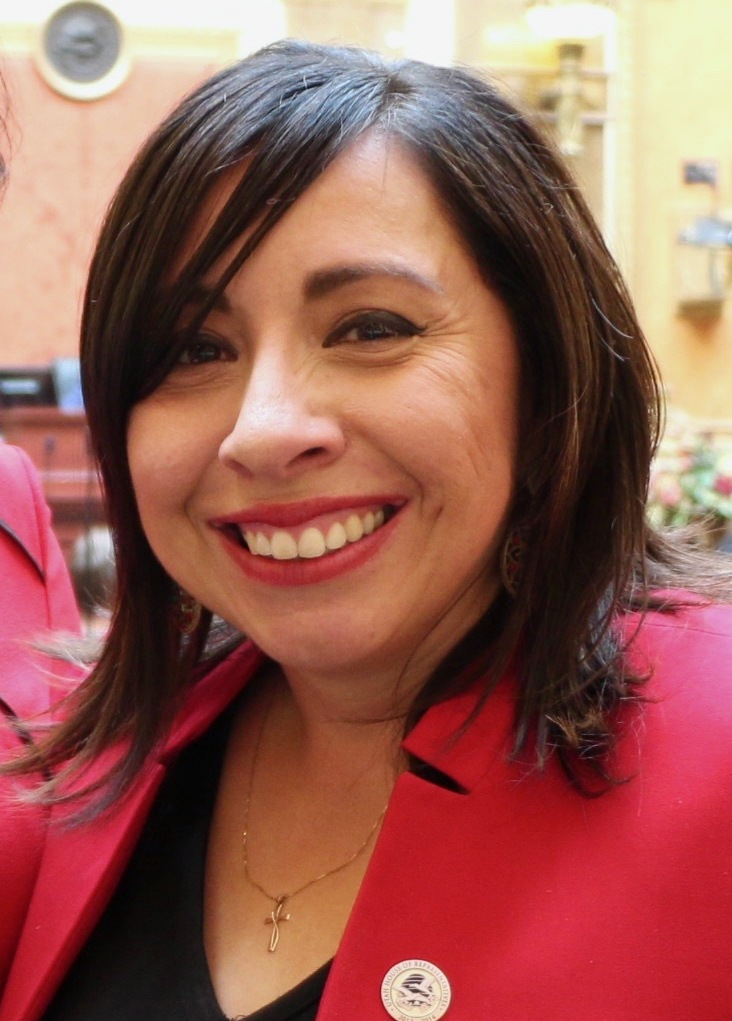
- Romero in 2017

Minority Leader of the Utah House of Representatives
- Incumbent
- Assumed office January 17, 2023
- Preceded by: Brian King

Member of the Utah House of Representatives
- Incumbent
- Assumed office January 1, 2013
- Preceded by: David Litvack
- Constituency: 26th district (2013–2023); 25th district (2023–present)

Personal details
- Born: Tooele, Utah, U.S.
- Party: Democratic
- Education: University of Utah (BA, MPA)
- Website: Campaign website

Angela Romero is an American politician and the Democratic leader of the Utah House of Representatives representing the 25th District since January 1, 2023. Prior to redistricting, she represented the 26th District since January 1, 2013.

== Early life and education ==
Romero was born and raised in Tooele, Utah. She is Chicana and Assiniboine. She attended the University of Utah where she earned a bachelor's degree in political science and later a master's degree in public administration.

== Political career ==
Romero was first elected in November 2012. During the 2016 legislative session, she served on the Executive Offices and Criminal Justice Appropriations Subcommittee, the House Economic Development and Workforce Services Committee, the House Ethics Committee, the House Law Enforcement and Criminal Justice Committee, and the House Public Utilities, Energy and Technology Interim Committee, Native American Legislative Liaison Committee.

=== NHCSL leadership ===
On February 26, 2018, Romero was elected First Vice President of the National Hispanic Caucus of State Legislators (NHCSL). And, in March 2022, she was elected President-Elect of the NHCSL for a two-year term, expected to be followed by service as President for the 2024-25 term.

As part of that NHCSL leadership role, Romero represented Utah in several meetings and events at the White House. She met with Vice President Kamala Harris on Hispanic policy priorities on March 25, 2022. They met again on August 5, 2022 to discuss fighting for abortion rights. And, Romero participated in the signing ceremony of the Respect for Marriage Act on December 13, 2022.

=== House minority leader ===
On November 22, 2022, Romero was elected Minority Leader for the 2023-24 term, succeeding Brian King. Romero's leadership team became the first all-women leadership team (of a minority or majority party) in the Utah House of Representatives, joining the also first-ever all-women Utah Senate Democratic leadership team elected 12 days earlier. At the same time, Romero joined Luz Escamilla in becoming the first Latinas to be elected Minority Leaders in the Utah Legislature.

== 2016 sponsored legislation ==
Bill Number	Bill Title	Status
HB0105	Human Trafficking Revisions	Governor signed - 3/23/2016
HB0148S01	Protective Order Amendments	Governor signed - 3/23/2016
HB0172S01	Public Assistance Benefits Amendments	Governor signed - 3/21/2016
HB0188	Paid Family Leave	House/ filed - 3/10/2016
HB0206S01	Human Trafficking Safe Harbor Amendments	Governor signed - 3/21/2016
HB0234	Adoptive and Foster Parents Amendments	House/ filed - 3/10/2016

Romero passed four of the six bills she proposed, giving her a 66% passage rate. She did not floor sponsor any legislation during 2016.

== Elections ==
- In 2014, Romero was unopposed in the Democratic convention. She faced Republican nominee Spencer Barclay in the general election, where she won with 2,977 votes (72.8%).
- In 2012, when District 26 incumbent Democratic Representative David Litvack left the Legislature and left the seat open, Romero was chosen by the Democratic convention over appointed incumbent Brian Doughty, who had been redistricted from District 30, and won the three-way November 6, 2012 general election with 4,926 votes (65.4%) against Republican nominee Andres Paredes and Green candidate Mark Dee Whitaker.

== Personal life ==
Romero and her son, Cio, live in the Glendale neighborhood where she also works as the Community Programs Manager for the Sorenson Unity Center. She is a Catholic.

== See also ==
- List of Native American politicians
- Native American women in politics

Utah House of Representatives
Preceded by Brian King	Minority Leader of the Utah House of Representatives; 2023–present	Incumbent
