= Kate A. Toomey =

American judge

Judge of the Utah Court of Appeals
- Incumbent
- Assumed office September 2014
- Appointed by: Gary Herbert

Personal details
- Education: University of Maryland (JD)

Kate A. Toomey is an American judge. She was appointed to the Utah Court of Appeals by Governor Gary Herbert in 2014.

Toomey was first appointed as a judge in January 2007. She sat on the Third District Court until 2014. Toomey took her oath of office for the Utah Court of Appeals in September 2014. Herbert said of Toomey, "Having served on the bench for over seven years, Judge Toomey is experienced, respected and will add exceptional value to the Court of Appeals." Prior to her appointment to the Utah Court of Appeals, Toomey served as a Judge in Third District Court for almost eight years. Toomey attended the University of Maryland law school and graduated in 1991.
