= Francis Gibson (politician) =

American politician

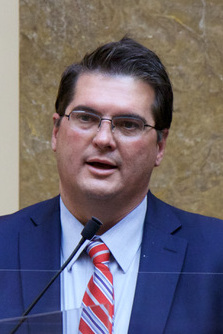

Majority Leader of the Utah House of Representatives
- In office January 28, 2019 – November 8, 2021
- Preceded by: Brad Wilson
- Succeeded by: Mike Schultz

Member of the Utah House of Representatives from the 65th district
- In office January 1, 2009 – November 8, 2021
- Preceded by: Aaron Tilton
- Succeeded by: Stephen L. Whyte

Personal details
- Born: November 20, 1969 (age 56)
- Party: Republican
- Spouse: Sheila
- Education: Brigham Young University, Utah (BS); University of Houston (MSW); Troy University (MBA)
- Website: Campaign website

Francis D. Gibson is an American politician and was a Republican member of the Utah House of Representatives representing District 65 from January 2009 to November 2021. His abrupt resignation in the middle of his term was unexpected, as he cited personal obligations.

== Early life and career ==
Gibson earned his BS from Brigham Young University and his MSW from the University of Houston. He currently works as a health administrator and lives in Mapleton, Utah with his wife Sheila.

== Political career ==
2014 Gibson was unopposed for both the Republican convention and the November 4, 2014 general election.

2012 Gibson was unopposed for the June 26, 2012 Republican Primary and won the November 6, 2012 General election with 11,183 votes (86.7%) against Constitution candidate Ken Bowers.

2010 Gibson was selected over a challenger by the Republican convention, and was unopposed for the November 2, 2010 General election, winning with 9,027 votes.

2008 Gibson challenged District 75 incumbent Republican Representative Aaron Tilton and was selected by the Republican convention for the November 4, 2008 General election, which he won with 11,230 votes (74.9%) against Democratic nominee Douglas Baxter.

During the 2016 legislative session, Gibson served as the majority whip and served on the Executive Appropriations Committee, Public Education Appropriations Subcommittee, Legislative Management Committee, the House Education Committee and the House Special Investigative Committee. Gibson was elected House majority leader in 2018.

On October 26, 2021, Gibson announced he would resign his seat in the House of Representatives, citing career and family considerations.

== 2016 sponsored legislation ==
Bill number	Bill title	Status
HB0185	Deception Detection Examiners Licensing Amendments	Governor Signed - 3/23/2016
HB0244	Independent Energy Producer Amendments	Governor Signed - 3/25/2016
HB0260	Sexual Exploitation of a Minor Amendments	Governor Signed - 3/21/2016
HB0293	Continuing Education Amendments	House/ filed - 3/10/2016
HB0355	Peace Officer Situational Training	Governor Signed - 3/30/2016
HB0386	Nursing Care Facility Amendments	Governor Signed - 3/25/2016
HB0436S03	Housing and Homeless Reform Initiative	Governor Signed - 3/25/2016
HB0443S01	School Dropout Prevention and Recovery	Governor Signed - 3/28/2016
HB0445	State School Board Amendments	Governor Signed - 3/18/2016

Gibson floor sponsored SB 71 Children's Justice Center Amendments, SB 102 High Coast Infrastructure Tax Credit Amendments, and SB 169 Olene Walker Housing Loan Fund Amendments.

Utah House of Representatives
Preceded by Brad Wilson	Majority Leader of the Utah House of Representatives; 2019–2021	Succeeded by Mike Schultz
