= Cheryl Acton =

American politician

Member of the Utah House of Representatives
- Incumbent
- Assumed office September 18, 2017
- Preceded by: Adam Gardiner
- Succeeded by: Sergio Sotelo (elect)
- Constituency: 43rd district (2017–2023); 38th district (2023–present)

Personal details
- Born: Kansas, U.S.
- Party: Republican
- Spouse: Scott Acton
- Children: 4
- Education: Brigham Young University (BA)
- Website: https://www.votecherylacton.com/

Cheryl K. Acton is an American politician and writer serving in the Utah House of Representatives, representing District 38. Acton was appointed on September 18, 2017 and subsequently won re-election in 2018, 2020, 2022, and 2024.

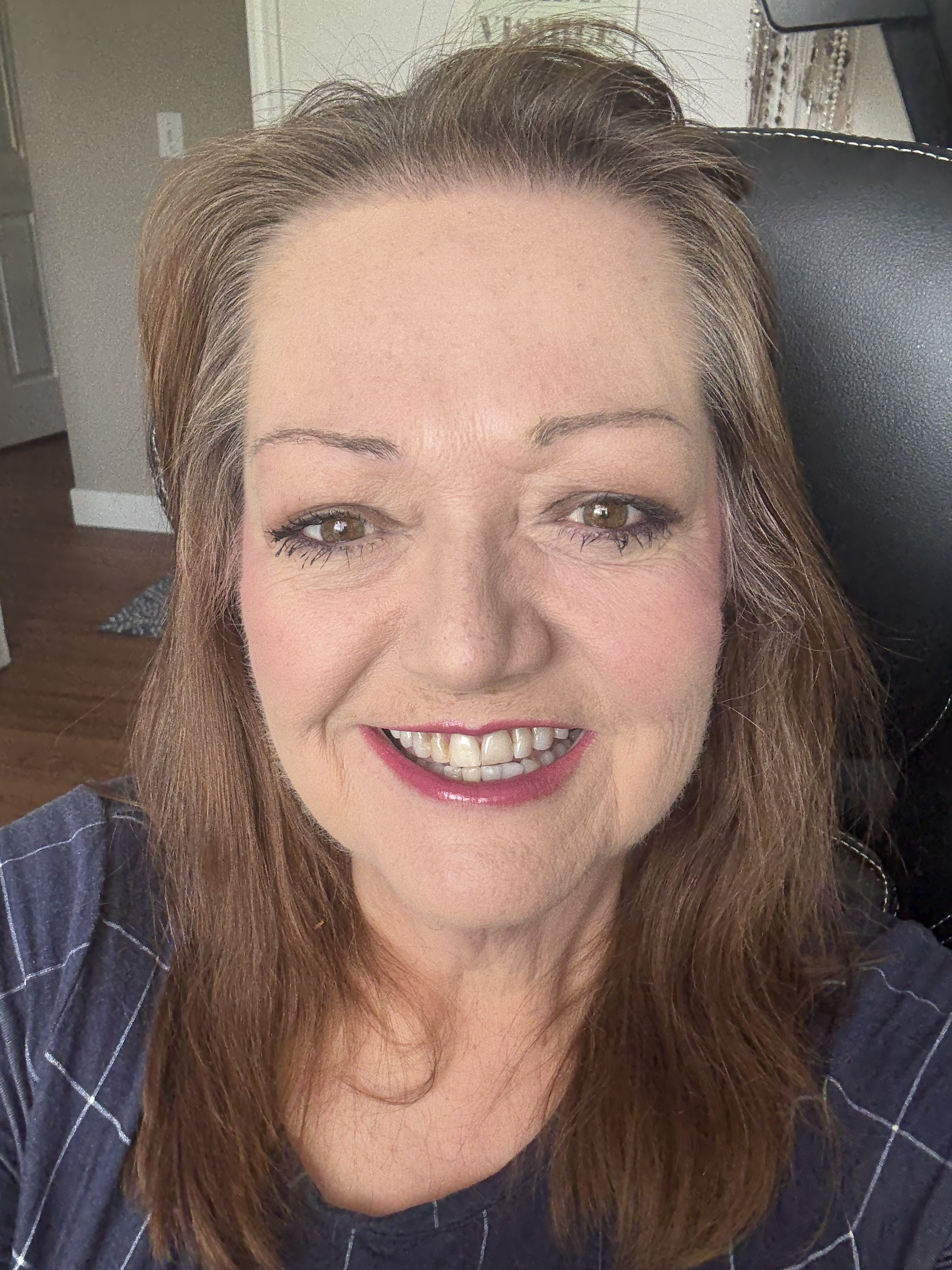

== Early life and career ==
Acton was born and raised in Kansas before moving to Arizona for her senior year of high school. She now lives in West Jordan. She graduated from Brigham Young University with a BA in English in 1987. She has also worked for the U.S. Census Bureau and the Department of Defense, where she earned the Meritorious Service Award. She has been a freelance writer and editor, an independent contractor, an internet researcher, and a journalist.

== Political career ==
In September 2017, Rep. Adam Gardiner stepped down from his legislative post to become Salt Lake County Recorder. The votes to replace Gardiner were tied: Acton and Lyle Decker split the votes of 52 GOP delegates in the second round of voting, and the race was decided with a coin toss. Her speech at the special election focused on three principles: freedom, civility, and the worth and dignity of every individual and family.

Acton won reelection in 2018, defeating Democratic challenger Diane Lewis with 47.94 percent of the popular vote. In the legislature, she has passed bills to protect the rights of consumers, people with disabilities, HOA residents, parents, and the unborn, among others.

Acton is the Chair of the Retirement and Independent Entities Committee and serves on Criminal Justice Appropriations, the House Health and Human Services Committee, and the House Judiciary Committee. She also serves on the Child Welfare Legislative Oversight Panel and the Utah Compact Commission.

== 2022 Sponsored Legislation ==
HB0006 Executive Offices and Criminal Justice Base Budget, HB0029S02 Driving Offenses Amendments, HB0055 Juvenile Justice Services Amendments, HB0319S01 Jordan River Improvement Amendments, HB0330 Department of Public Safety Restricted Account Amendments, HB0431 Social Credit Score Amendments, HB0439S01 Elected Public Body Transparency Amendments, HCR010 Concurrent Resolution Regarding an Interlocal Agreement Creating the Jordan River Commission, Concurrent Resolution Encouraging Prevention of Adverse Childhood Experiences

== Personal life ==
Acton and her husband, Scott, have four adult children, two sons and two daughters. As a family, they have traveled together to all 50 states. She has resided in West Jordan for 28 years.
