= Utah Department of Environmental Quality =

U.S. state government agency

Agency overview
- Jurisdiction: Utah State Government
- Headquarters: Salt Lake City, Utah
- Agency executives: Tim Davis, Executive Director; Ashley Summers, Deputy Director
- Child agencies: Division of Air Quality; Division of Drinking Water; Division of Environmental Response & Remediation; Division of Waste Management & Radiation Control; Division of Water Quality
- Website: deq.utah.gov

The Utah Department of Environmental Quality (DEQ) is a state governmental organization headquartered in Salt Lake City, Utah. DEQ's mission is to safeguard the public health and quality of life of Utahns by protecting and enhancing the environment. DEQ implements State and federal environmental laws and works with individuals, community groups, and businesses to protect the quality of Utah's air, land and water.
