= James Dunnigan (politician) =

American politician (born 1953)

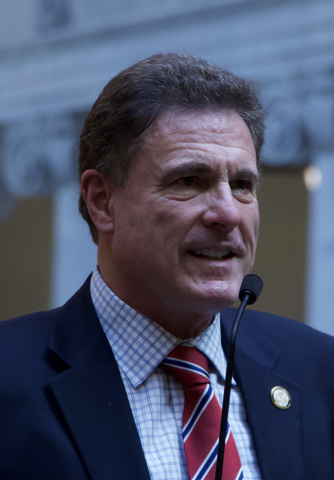

Speaker pro tempore of the Utah House of Representatives
- Incumbent
- Assumed office January 17, 2023
- Preceded by: V. Lowry Snow

Majority Leader of the Utah House of Representatives
- In office January 26, 2015 – January 23, 2017
- Preceded by: Brad Dee
- Succeeded by: Brad Wilson

Member of the Utah House of Representatives
- Incumbent
- Assumed office January 1, 2003
- Preceded by: Cindy Beshear
- Succeeded by: Blake Townsend (elect)
- Constituency: 39th district (2003–2023); 36th district (2023–present)

Personal details
- Born: March 31, 1953 (age 73) Salt Lake City, Utah, U.S.
- Party: Republican
- Education: University of Utah (BS)
- Website: Campaign website

James 'Jim' A. Dunnigan (born March 31, 1953) is an American politician serving as a member of the Utah House of Representatives for the 36th district. Elected in November 2002, he assumed office on January 1, 2003.

== Early life and education ==
Dunnigan was born on March 31, 1953, in Salt Lake City. He earned a Bachelor of Arts degree in business management from the University of Utah.

== Career ==
Outside of politics, Dunnigan owns an insurance agency. He served as a member of the Taylorsville/Bennion Community Council and the Taylorsville City Council.

Dunnigan was elected to the Utah House of Representatives in November 2002 and assumed office on January 1, 2003. During the 2015 and 2016 general sessions, Dunnigan served as the House's majority leader. He was challenged by Brad Wilson for the position in 2016 and ultimately dropped out of the leadership race before voting took place.

== Personal life ==
He currently lives in Taylorsville, Utah with his wife Vicki and two children.

Utah House of Representatives
| Preceded by Brad Dee | Majority Leader of the Utah House of Representatives; 2015–2017 | Succeeded by Brad Wilson |
| Preceded by V. Lowry Snow | Speaker pro tempore of the Utah House of Representatives; 2023–present | Incumbent |
