= 2021 in Utah =

- Decades: 2000s; 2010s; 2020s; 2030s
- See also: History of Utah; Historical outline of Utah; List of years in Utah; 2021 in the United States

The following is a list of events of the year 2021 in Utah.

== Incumbents ==
=== State government ===
- Governor: Spencer Cox (R)

== Events ==
Ongoing: COVID-19 pandemic in Utah

- February 6: Four skiers are killed and four others are injured in an avalanche in Millcreek Canyon.
- April 19: A research team based at the Grand Staircase–Escalante National Monument announces that the many Teratophoneus fossils unearthed at the site provide proof that, contrary to popular belief, Tyrannosaurus dinosaurs hunted in packs rather than individually.
- July 26: A dust storm causes a 20-vehicle pileup on Interstate 15 in Utah, killing eight people and injuring several others, some of whom are in critical condition, according to a statement from the Utah Highway Patrol.
- August 3: Governor Spencer Cox announces that Utah will offer K95 and KN95 masks to students during the fall semester.

== See also ==
- 2021 in the United States
