= 2026 in Utah =

- Decades: 2000s; 2010s; 2020s; 2030s
- See also: History of Utah; Historical outline of Utah; List of years in Utah; 2026 in the United States

The following is a list of events of the year 2026 in Utah.

== Incumbents ==
=== State government ===
- Governor: Spencer Cox (R)

== Events ==
=== January ===
- January 7 – Two people are killed and six injured in a shooting outside a Latter-day Saint chapel in Salt Lake City.
- January 22–February 1 – The 2026 Sundance Film Festival is held in Park City. The festival is the last held in Utah before it moves to Boulder, Colorado in 2027.
  - January 24 – A man is arrested for assaulting House Representative Maxwell Frost (D-FL) and yelling racial slurs at him and a woman during the film festival.

=== March ===
- March 4 – Three women are murdered in Wayne County. A woman in her 80s is killed at her home in Lyman, and two other women are killed on a hiking trail near Torrey. A suspect, a 22-year-old man from Iowa, is arrested in Colorado the next day.
- March 17 – Kouri Richins, who had written a children's book about grief based on the death of her husband Eric, is convicted of murdering him. Kouri Richins had been accused of poisoning Eric with a fentanyl-laced cocktail at their Kamas home.
- March 31 – The United States Forest Service announces its headquarters will be moved from Washington, D.C. to Salt Lake City.

=== April ===
- April 1 – The Utah County Sheriff's Office reports that DNA testing confirmed that serial killer Ted Bundy was responsible for the 1974 murder of 17-year-old Laura Ann Aime.

=== May ===
- May 4 – Commissioners in Box Elder County approve the construction of a data center in the county. The planned data center is twice the size of Manhattan.

=== June ===
- June 14 – Two people, including extreme athlete Andy Lewis, are killed in a BASE jumping accident in Grand County.
- June 22 – The Cottonwood Fire starts in Beaver County.
- June 26 – Assassination of Charlie Kirk: The judge in the trial of Tyler Robinson holds prosecutors in contempt over comments they made to media organizations about Robinson. The judge also denies a request by the defense to drop the death penalty as a sanction over the comments.

=== July ===
- July 6 – The state of Utah revokes the license of the Provo Canyon School, citing multiple noncompliance issues.
- July 13 – A kiosk worker is stabbed 15 times by a 48-year-old man at the Valley Fair Mall because of the worker's Muslim identity and the suspect's intent "to kill Muslims", according to police. The suspect is later arrested by police at the scene.
- July 17 – A family of five are killed by flash floods while hiking at a canyon in Bicknell.

=== September ===
- September 10 – Governor Spencer Cox declares September 10 as "Charlie Kirk Day".
- September 24 – Wasatch County Sheriff Jared Rigby and former Summit County Sheriff Dave Edmunds are charged with obstruction of justice in connection to the Kouri Richards investigation.

=== October ===
- October 1 – A house fire in Riverdale leaves four people dead, including three children.
- October 27 – The Summit County District Attorney announces that DNA testing has linked Ted Bundy to the 1974 murder of Melissa Ann Smith.
- October 28 – The state of Utah files criminal charges against prediction market Kalshi and its cofounders Tarek Mansour and Luana Lopes Lara, accusing the company of violating the state's gambling laws.

=== November ===
- November 3:
  - 2026 Utah House Bill 267 veto referendum
  - 2026 Utah House of Representatives election
  - 2026 Utah Senate election
  - 2026 United States House of Representatives elections in Utah

== See also ==
- 2026 in the United States
