= A. bigelovii =

A. bigelovii may refer to:

- Allium bigelovii, the New Mexico wild leek, a flowering plant species
- Amaranthus bigelovii, a flowering plant species
- Artemisia bigelovii, the Bigelow sagebrush, a flowering plant species
