= 2025 in Utah =

- Decades: 2000s; 2010s; 2020s; 2030s
- See also: History of Utah; Historical outline of Utah; List of years in Utah; 2025 in the United States

The following is a list of events of the year 2025 in Utah.

== Incumbents ==
=== State government ===
- Governor: Spencer Cox (R)

== Events ==
- January 4 – Utah is impacted by the January 5–6, 2025 United States blizzard.
- January 23–February 2 – 2025 Sundance Film Festival
- March 28 – Utah becomes the first US state to ban LGBTQ pride flags in government buildings and schools.
- May 6 – In response to the LGBTQ pride flag ban enacted in March, Salt Lake City adopts two new official flags depicting the sego lily atop the pride flag and transgender flag, respectively.
- May 7 – The name of the new National Hockey League (NHL) team based in Salt Lake City is revealed to be the Utah Mammoth.
- June 14 – During a No Kings Day protest in Salt Lake City, a member of the protest's security team shoots at a man armed with a rifle, injuring him and killing bystander Afa Ah Loo.
- June 15 – Three people are killed, including an infant, and two teenagers are injured in a shooting following a confrontation at a carnival in West Valley City.
- June 20 – 2025 Southwest United States measles outbreak: Health officials confirm the state's first measles case of 2025.
- June 25 – American social media influencer Tanner Martin, previously diagnosed with Stage IV colorectal cancer in 2020, announces his death from the disease in a pre-recorded TikTok video.
- August 18 – Two police officers are killed and one wounded in a shooting in Tremonton. The suspect is arrested at the scene.
- September 10 – Conservative activist Charlie Kirk is assassinated by gunshot during an event at Utah Valley University in Orem. A suspect is arrested two days later.
- November 10 – A judge rejects a proposed congressional map drawn by Republicans that would have split Salt Lake City among Utah's four House districts. The judge institutes a map that puts most of the city in one district, essentially creating one solid Democratic district and three Republican ones.
- December 9 – The University of Utah board of trustees votes to create a company called Utah Brands & Entertainment that the private equity firm Otro Capital has a minority stake in. Utah Brands & Entertainment would control much of the athletic programs of the University of Utah.

== Deaths ==
- August 18 – Deng Mayar, 22, basketball player, drowned.
- September 10 - Charlie Kirk, 31, right wing political activist

== See also ==
- 2025 in the United States
