= 2022 in Utah =

- Decades: 2000s; 2010s; 2020s; 2030s
- See also: History of Utah; Historical outline of Utah; List of years in Utah; 2022 in the United States

The following is a list of events of the year 2022 in Utah.

== Incumbents ==
=== State government ===
- Governor:Spencer Cox (R)

== Events ==
- March: Utah House Bill 11, prohibiting transgender girls from competing in women’s school sports is vetoed but later overridden.
- June 27 – State judges temporarily block the abortion bans for all stages of pregnancy that state officials announced after the Supreme Court's ruling in Dobbs v. Jackson Women's Health Organization.
- August 19 – A woman is killed in Zion National Park following flooding that affected several states.

== See also ==
- 2022 in the United States
