= 2023 in Utah =

- Decades: 2000s; 2010s; 2020s; 2030s
- See also: History of Utah; Historical outline of Utah; List of years in Utah; 2023 in the United States

The following is a list of events of the year 2023 in Utah.

== Incumbents ==
=== State government ===
- Governor:Spencer Cox (R)

== Events ==
- January 4 – Killing of the Haight family: Three adults and five children are found dead inside a home in Enoch, after police conduct a welfare check.
- March 21 – Utah adopts a new flag after the governor officializes it. It came into official use in March 2024.
- August 9 – A man in Provo who made threats against President Joe Biden is shot and killed by FBI agents.
- October 1 – North Dakota state senator Doug Larsen and his family are killed in a plane crash in Grand County.
- November 24 – Astronomers at the Telescope Array Project observe the second largest cosmic ray ever detected, the so-called Amaterasu particle, with an energy of 244 EeV.

== See also ==
- 2023 in the United States
