= 2024 in Utah =

- Decades: 2000s; 2010s; 2020s; 2030s
- See also: History of Utah; Historical outline of Utah; List of years in Utah; 2024 in the United States

The following is a list of events of the year 2024 in Utah.

== Incumbents ==
=== State government ===
- Governor: Spencer Cox (R)

== Events ==
- March 5 –
  - Super Tuesday:
    - The Democratic Party holds presidential nominating contests in Utah, amongst other states.
    - The Republican Party holds presidential nominating contests in Utah, amongst other states.
- April 18 – In ice hockey, the National Hockey League board approves the relocation of the hockey assets of the Arizona Coyotes to Salt Lake City. The currently unnamed expansion team will play their home games at the Delta Center, while the Coyotes franchise will be deactivated pending the construction of a new arena in the Phoenix metropolitan area.
- July 24 – At the International Olympic Committee's meeting in Paris, France, it is announced that Salt Lake City will host the 2034 Winter Olympics.
- August 8 – Utah sees its first execution since 2010 in August.
- November 5 –
  - 2024 United States presidential election in Utah
  - 2024 Utah House of Representatives election

== See also ==
- 2024 in the United States
