= Geography of Utah =

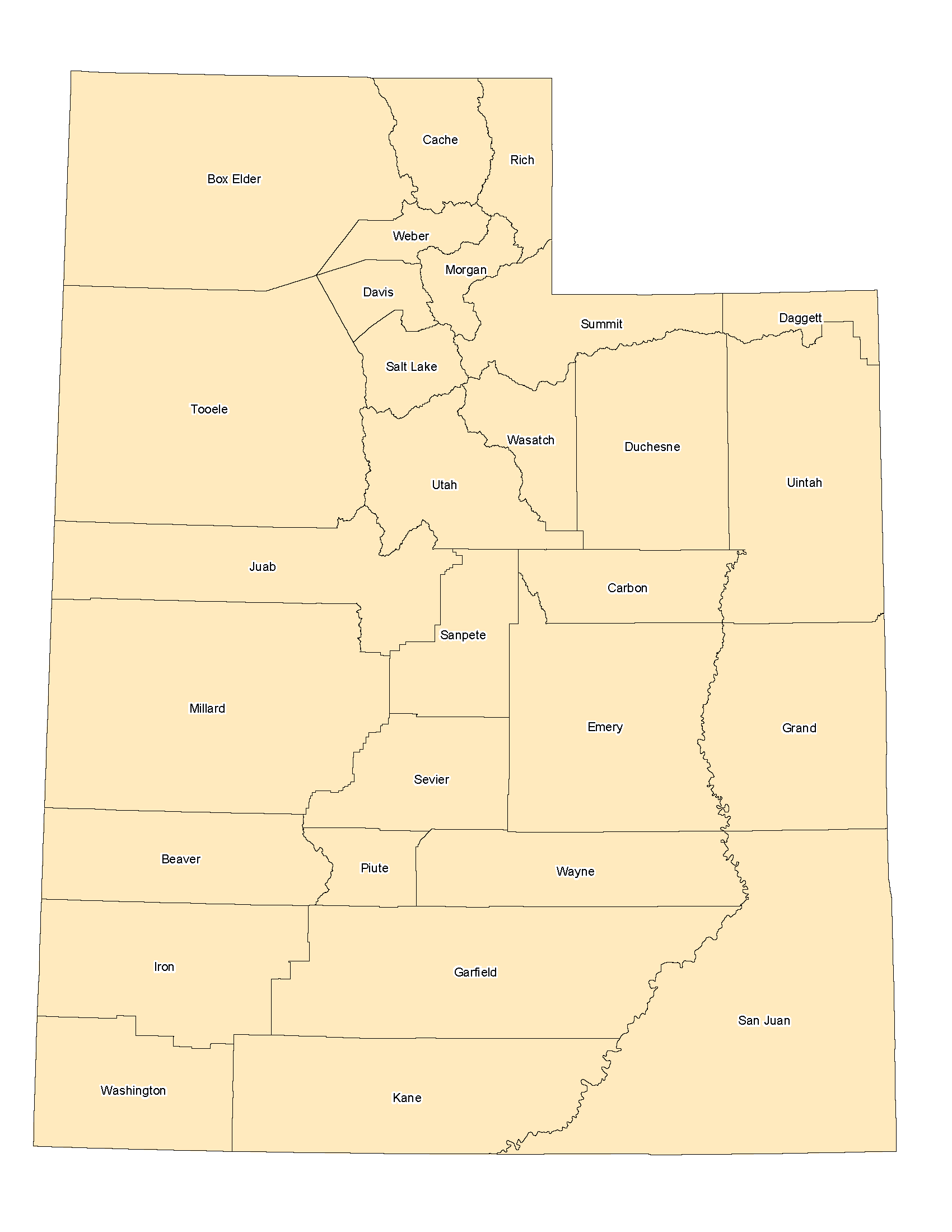
Utah county boundaries

The landlocked U.S. state of Utah is known for its natural diversity and is home to features ranging from arid deserts with sand dunes to thriving pine forests in mountain valleys. It is a rugged and geographically diverse state at the convergence of three distinct geological regions: the Rocky Mountains, the Great Basin, and the Colorado Plateau.

== Boundaries ==
Utah covers an area of 84,899 sq mi (219,890 km^{2}). It is one of the Four Corners states and is bordered by Idaho in the north, Wyoming in the north and east, by Colorado in the east, at a single point by New Mexico to the southeast, by Arizona in the south, and by Nevada in the west.

The northern border with Idaho is inherited from the Adams–Onís Treaty of 1819, which defined the boundary between the Louisiana Purchase and New Spain. The large size of the proposed State of Deseret was controversial. The Compromise of 1850 gave the Utah Territory five degrees of latitude, cutting the land east of the new state of California roughly in half. The creation of the Colorado Territory in 1861 moved Utah's eastern border from the Rocky Mountains to the 109th western meridian, to give Colorado Territory seven degrees of longitude (like Oregon previously had and four more western states would later get).

To secure the booming Comstock Lode area in western Utah Territory for the Union during the American Civil War against the uncertain loyalties of the Mormons of Utah, Congress created the Nevada Territory in 1861. The Nevada Territory's boundary with the Utah Territory was moved from the 116th to the 115th meridian as more mineral deposits were discovered. Congress moved it to the 114th meridian when Nevada was granted statehood, in order to include access to Colorado River tributaries.

The northwestern notch in the Utah Territory was created with the formation of the Nebraska Territory in 1854. When the Wyoming Territory was created in 1868, the notch was expanded to give Wyoming seven degrees of longitude. The notch area is separated from Salt Lake City by the Uinta Mountains and the Wasatch Range, making it easier for Wyoming authorities to administer. Anti-Mormon sentiment may have also led to this area being assigned to Wyoming. It contained coal fields, various waterways, and parts of the Oregon Trail, California Trail, Overland Trail, transcontinental telegraph, stagecoach route, and future transcontinental railroad.

== Features and geology ==
One of Utah's defining characteristics is the variety of its terrain. Running down the middle of the state's northern third is the Wasatch Range, which rises to heights of almost 12,000 ft (3,700 m) above sea level. Utah is home to world-renowned ski resorts made popular by light, fluffy snow and winter storms that regularly dump up to three feet of it overnight. In the state's northeastern section, running east to west, are the Uinta Mountains, which rise to heights of over 13,000 feet (4,000 m). The highest point in the state, Kings Peak, at 13,528 feet (4,123 m), lies within the Uinta Mountains.

At the western base of the Wasatch Range is the Wasatch Front, a series of valleys and basins that are home to the most populous parts of the state. It stretches approximately from Brigham City at the north end to Nephi at the south end. Approximately 75 percent of the state's population lives in this corridor, and population growth is rapid.

Western Utah is mostly arid desert with a basin and range topography. Small mountain ranges and rugged terrain punctuate the landscape. The Bonneville Salt Flats are an exception, being comparatively flat as a result of once forming the bed of ancient Lake Bonneville. Great Salt Lake, Utah Lake, Sevier Lake, and Rush Lake are all remnants of this ancient freshwater lake, which once covered most of the eastern Great Basin. West of the Great Salt Lake, stretching to the Nevada border, lies the arid Great Salt Lake Desert. One exception to this aridity is Snake Valley, which is (relatively) lush due to large springs and wetlands fed from groundwater derived from snow melt in the Snake Range, Deep Creek Range, and other tall mountains to the west of Snake Valley. Great Basin National Park is just over the Nevada state line in the southern Snake Range. One of western Utah's most impressive, but least visited attractions is Notch Peak, the tallest limestone cliff in North America, located west of Delta.

Much of the scenic southern and southeastern landscape (specifically the Colorado Plateau region) is sandstone, specifically Kayenta sandstone and Navajo sandstone. The Colorado River and its tributaries wind their way through the sandstone, creating some of the world's most striking and wild terrain (the area around the confluence of the Colorado and Green Rivers was the last to be mapped in the lower 48 United States). Wind and rain have also sculpted the soft sandstone over millions of years. Canyons, gullies, arches, pinnacles, buttes, bluffs, and mesas are the common sights throughout south-central and southeast Utah.

This terrain is the central feature of protected state and federal parks such as Arches, Bryce Canyon, Canyonlands, Capitol Reef, and Zion national parks, Cedar Breaks, Grand Staircase–Escalante, Hovenweep, and Natural Bridges national monuments, Glen Canyon National Recreation Area (site of the popular tourist destination, Lake Powell), Dead Horse Point and Goblin Valley state parks, and Monument Valley. The Navajo Nation also extends into southeastern Utah. Southeastern Utah is also punctuated by the remote, but lofty La Sal, Abajo, and Henry mountain ranges.

Eastern (northern quarter) Utah is a high-elevation area covered mostly by plateaus and basins, particularly the Tavaputs Plateau and San Rafael Swell, which remain mostly inaccessible, and the Uinta Basin, where the majority of eastern Utah's population lives. Economies are dominated by mining, oil shale, oil, and natural gas-drilling, ranching, and recreation. Much of eastern Utah is part of the Uintah and Ouray Indian Reservation. The most popular destination within northeastern Utah is Dinosaur National Monument near Vernal.

Southwestern Utah is the lowest and hottest spot in Utah. It is known as Utah's Dixie because early settlers were able to grow some cotton there. Beaverdam Wash in far southwestern Utah is the lowest point in the state, at 2,000 feet (610 m). The northernmost portion of the Mojave Desert is also located in this area. Dixie is quickly becoming a popular recreational and retirement destination, and the population is growing rapidly. Although the Wasatch Mountains end at Mount Nebo near Nephi, a complex series of mountain ranges extends south from the southern end of the range down the spine of Utah. Just north of Dixie and east of Cedar City is the state's highest ski resort, Brian Head.

Like most of the western states, the federal government owns much of the land in Utah. Over 70 percent of the land is either BLM land, Utah State Trustland, or U.S. National Forest, U.S. National Park, U.S. National Monument, National Recreation Area or U.S. Wilderness Area. Utah is the only state where every county contains some national forest.

=== Adjacent states ===
- Idaho (north)
- Wyoming (east and north)
- Colorado (east)
- Nevada (west)
- Arizona (south)

== Climate ==
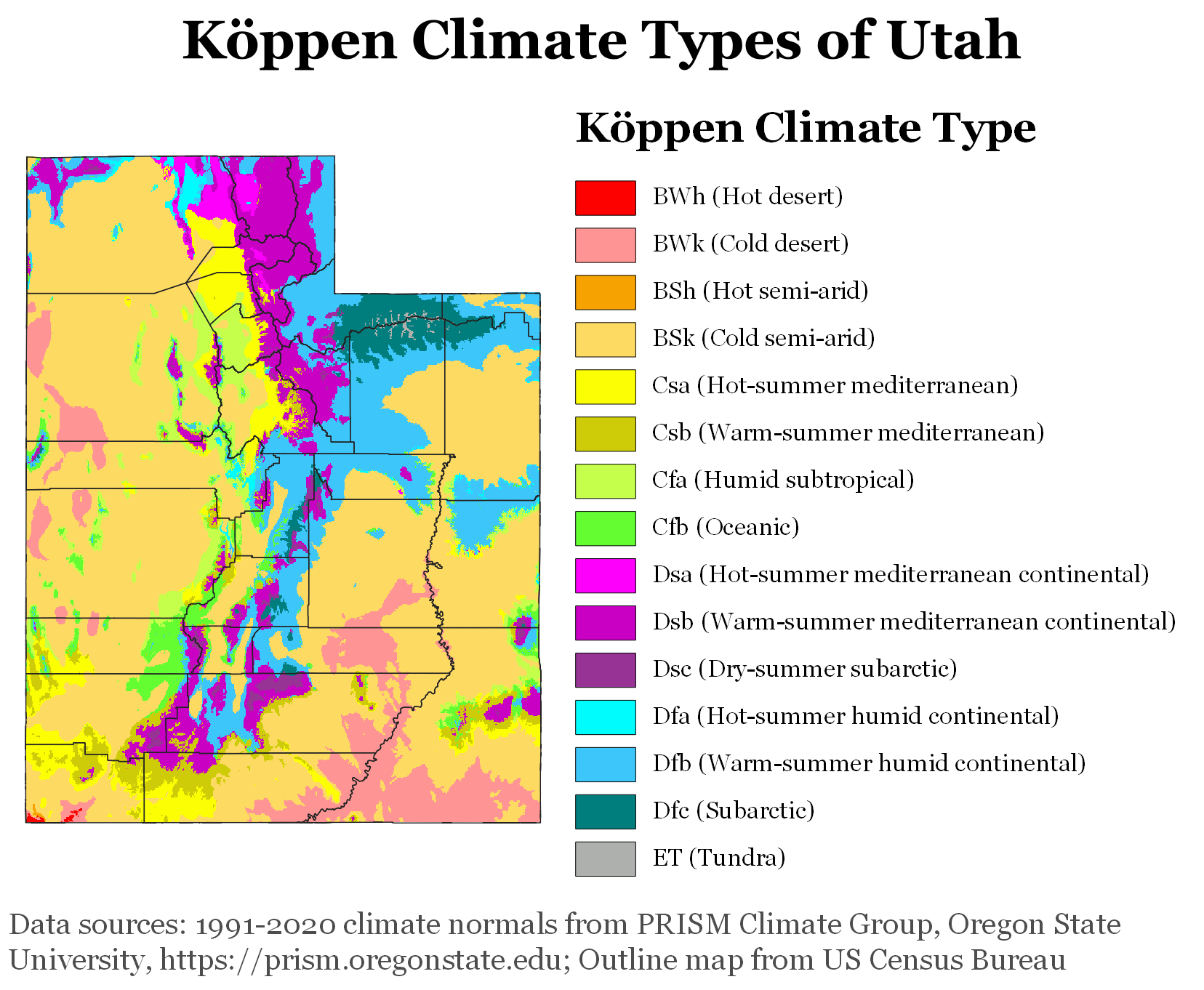
Köppen climate types of Utah, using 1991-2020 climate normals.

Utah features a dry, semi-arid to desert climate, although its many mountains feature a large variety of climates, with the highest points in the Uinta Mountains being above the timberline. The dry weather is a result of the state's location in the rain shadow of the Sierra Nevada in California. The eastern half of the state lies in the rain shadow of the Wasatch Mountains. The primary source of precipitation for the state is the Pacific Ocean, with the state usually lying in the path of large Pacific storms from October to May. In summer, the state, especially southern and eastern Utah, lies in the path of monsoon moisture from the Gulf of California.

Most of the lowland areas receive less than 12 inches (305 mm) of precipitation annually, although the I-15 corridor, including the densely populated Wasatch Front, receives approximately 15 inches (381 mm). The Great Salt Lake Desert is the driest area of the state, with less than 5 inches (127 mm). Snowfall is common in all but the far southern valleys. Although St. George receives only about 3 inches (76 mm) per year, Salt Lake City sees about 60 inches (1,524 mm), enhanced by the lake-effect snow from the Great Salt Lake, which increases snowfall totals to the south, southeast, and east of the lake.

Some areas of the Wasatch Range in the path of the lake-effect receive up to 500 inches (12,700 mm) per year. This micro climate of enhanced snowfall from the Great Salt Lake spans the entire proximity of the lake. The cottonwood canyons adjacent to Salt Lake City are located in the right position to receive more precipitation from the lake. The consistently deep powder snow led Utah's ski industry to adopt the slogan "the Greatest Snow on Earth" in the 1980s. In the winter, temperature inversions are a common phenomenon across Utah's low basins and valleys, leading to thick haze and fog that can last for weeks at a time, especially in the Uintah Basin. Although at other times of year its air quality is good, winter inversions give Salt Lake City some of the worst wintertime pollution in the country.

Previous studies have indicated a widespread decline in snowpack over Utah accompanied by a decline in the snow–precipitation ratio while anecdotal evidence claims have been put forward that measured changes in Utah's snowpack are spurious and do not reflect actual change. A 2012 study found that the proportion of winter (January–March) precipitation falling as snow has decreased by nine percent during the last half century, a combined result from a significant increase in rainfall and a minor decrease in snowfall. Meanwhile, observed snow depth across Utah has decreased and is accompanied by consistent decreases in snow cover and surface albedo. Weather systems with the potential to produce precipitation in Utah have decreased in number with those producing snowfall decreasing at a considerably greater rate.

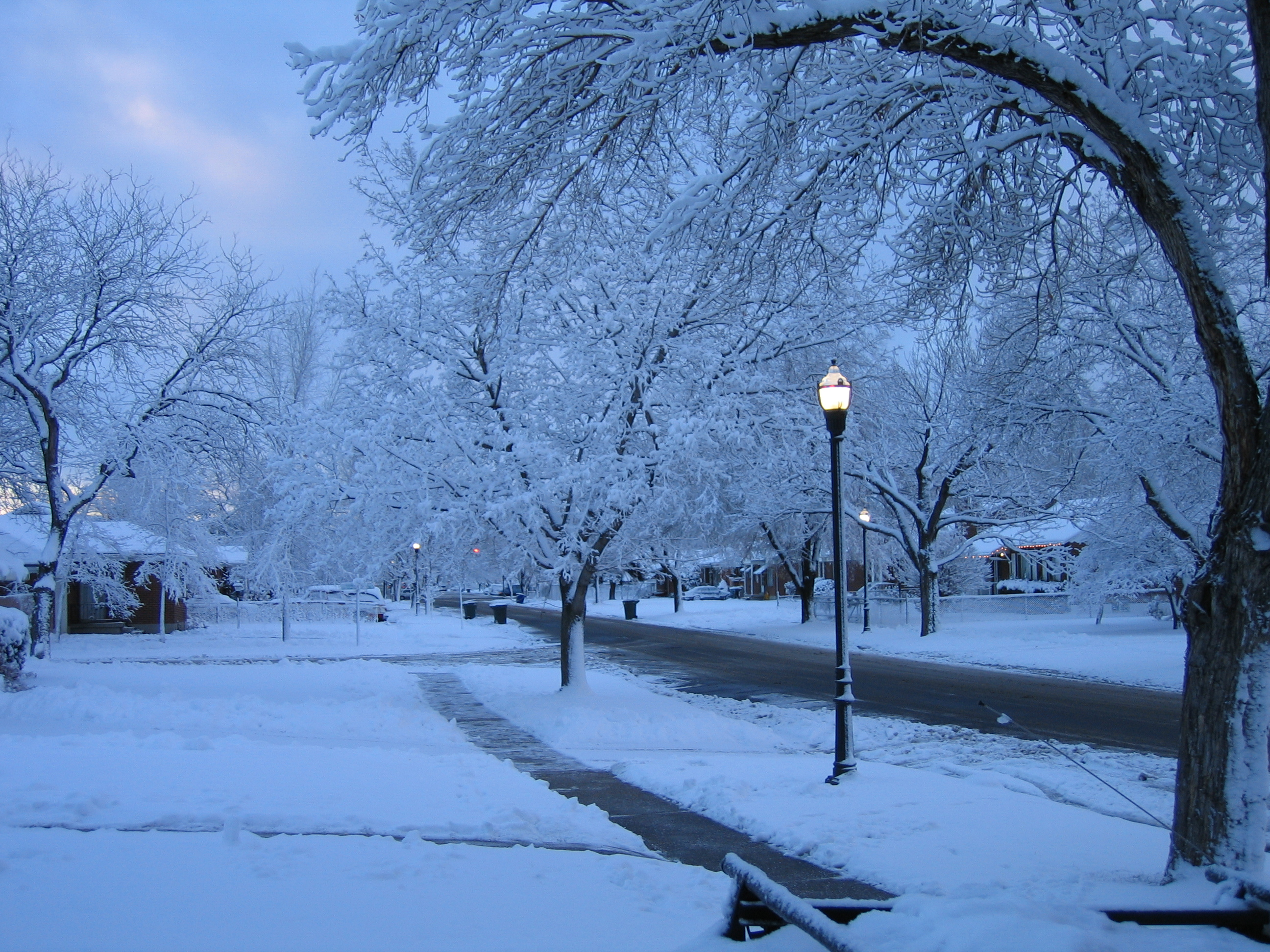
Snow in Rose Park, Salt Lake City

Utah's temperatures are extreme, with cold temperatures in winter due to its elevation, and very hot summers statewide (with the exception of mountain areas and high mountain valleys). Utah is usually protected from major blasts of cold air by mountains lying north and east of the state, although major Arctic blasts can occasionally reach the state. Average January high temperatures range from around 30 °F (−1 °C) in some northern valleys to almost 55 °F (13 °C) in St. George.

Temperatures dropping below 0 °F (−18 °C) should be expected on occasion in most areas of the state most years, although some areas see it often (for example, the town of Randolph averages about fifty days per year with temperatures that low). In July, average highs range from about 85 to 100 °F (29 to 38 °C). However, the low humidity and high elevation typically leads to large temperature variations, leading to cool nights most summer days. The record high temperature in Utah was 118 °F (48 °C), recorded south of St. George on July 4, 2007, and the record low was −69 °F (−56 °C), recorded at Peter Sinks in the Bear River Mountains of northern Utah on February 1, 1985. However, the record low for an inhabited location is −49 °F (−45 °C) at Woodruff on December 12, 1932.

Utah, like most of the western United States, has few days of thunderstorms. On average there are fewer than 40 days of thunderstorm activity during the year, although these storms can be briefly intense when they do occur. They are most likely to occur during monsoon season from about mid-July through mid-September, especially in southern and eastern Utah. Dry lightning strikes and the general dry weather often spark wildfires in summer, while intense thunderstorms can lead to flash flooding, especially in the rugged terrain of southern Utah. Although spring is the wettest season in northern Utah, late summer is the wettest period for much of the south and east of the state. Tornadoes are uncommon in Utah, with an average of two striking the state yearly, rarely higher than EF1 intensity.

One exception of note, however, was the unprecedented Salt Lake City Tornado that moved directly across downtown Salt Lake City on August 11, 1999. The F2 tornado killed one person, injured sixty others, and caused approximately $170 million in damage; it was the second strongest tornado in the state behind an F3 on August 11, 1993, in the Uinta Mountains. The only other reported tornado fatality in Utah's history was a 7-year-old girl who was killed while camping in Summit County on July 6, 1884. The last tornado of above (E)F0 intensity occurred on September 8, 2002, when an F2 tornado hit Manti.

=== Climate data ===
Climate data for Salt Lake City International Airport (1991–2020 normals, (Note: Mean monthly maxima and minima (i.e. the expected highest and lowest temperature readings at any point during the year or given month) calculated based on data at said location from 1991 to 2020.) extremes 1874–present) (Note: The official Salt Lake City climatology station was located in downtown from March 1874 to April 30, 1928 and at Salt Lake City Int'l since May 1, 1928. For further information, see ThreadEx.)
Month	Jan	Feb	Mar	Apr	May	Jun	Jul	Aug	Sep	Oct	Nov	Dec	Year
Record high °F (°C)	63 (17)	69 (21)	84 (29)	89 (32)	99 (37)	107 (42)	109 (43)	106 (41)	107 (42)	92 (33)	75 (24)	69 (21)	109 (43)
Mean maximum °F (°C)	51.8 (11.0)	58.8 (14.9)	70.4 (21.3)	80.2 (26.8)	88.9 (31.6)	97.9 (36.6)	101.9 (38.8)	99.6 (37.6)	93.9 (34.4)	82.0 (27.8)	67.1 (19.5)	54.3 (12.4)	102.3 (39.1)
Mean daily maximum °F (°C)	38.6 (3.7)	44.7 (7.1)	55.3 (12.9)	61.9 (16.6)	72.6 (22.6)	84.1 (28.9)	94.0 (34.4)	91.7 (33.2)	80.6 (27.0)	65.5 (18.6)	50.7 (10.4)	39.0 (3.9)	64.9 (18.3)
Daily mean °F (°C)	31.4 (−0.3)	36.6 (2.6)	45.8 (7.7)	51.8 (11.0)	61.5 (16.4)	71.6 (22.0)	81.1 (27.3)	79.1 (26.2)	68.4 (20.2)	54.6 (12.6)	41.7 (5.4)	32.2 (0.1)	54.7 (12.6)
Mean daily minimum °F (°C)	24.2 (−4.3)	28.6 (−1.9)	36.3 (2.4)	41.8 (5.4)	50.4 (10.2)	59.1 (15.1)	68.2 (20.1)	66.6 (19.2)	56.3 (13.5)	43.6 (6.4)	32.8 (0.4)	25.3 (−3.7)	44.4 (6.9)
Mean minimum °F (°C)	6.5 (−14.2)	9.2 (−12.7)	21.0 (−6.1)	28.7 (−1.8)	34.8 (1.6)	43.5 (6.4)	54.9 (12.7)	52.4 (11.3)	39.7 (4.3)	29.5 (−1.4)	16.9 (−8.4)	7.3 (−13.7)	0.9 (−17.3)
Record low °F (°C)	−22 (−30)	−30 (−34)	0 (−18)	14 (−10)	25 (−4)	32 (0)	40 (4)	37 (3)	27 (−3)	14 (−10)	−14 (−26)	−21 (−29)	−30 (−34)
Average precipitation inches (mm)	1.43 (36)	1.30 (33)	1.75 (44)	2.16 (55)	1.82 (46)	0.95 (24)	0.49 (12)	0.58 (15)	1.06 (27)	1.26 (32)	1.32 (34)	1.40 (36)	15.52 (394)
Average snowfall inches (cm)	12.7 (32)	10.7 (27)	5.9 (15)	2.9 (7.4)	0.1 (0.25)	0.0 (0.0)	0.0 (0.0)	0.0 (0.0)	0.0 (0.0)	0.5 (1.3)	7.0 (18)	12.1 (31)	51.9 (132)
Average precipitation days (≥ 0.01 in)	10.3	9.5	9.2	10.4	8.9	4.8	3.9	4.9	5.2	6.5	8.3	9.6	91.5
Average snowy days (≥ 0.1 in)	7.6	6.0	4.0	2.2	0.2	0.0	0.0	0.0	0.0	0.7	3.6	7.1	31.4
Average relative humidity (%)	74.0	69.8	60.2	53.2	48.7	41.4	35.9	38.5	45.6	55.7	66.3	74.3	55.3
Average dew point °F (°C)	19.9 (−6.7)	24.1 (−4.4)	27.1 (−2.7)	31.1 (−0.5)	36.9 (2.7)	41.4 (5.2)	45.7 (7.6)	45.1 (7.3)	39.9 (4.4)	34.5 (1.4)	28.4 (−2.0)	21.7 (−5.7)	33.0 (0.5)
Mean monthly sunshine hours	127.4	163.1	241.9	269.1	321.7	360.5	380.5	352.5	301.1	248.1	150.4	113.1	3,029.4
Percentage possible sunshine	43	55	65	67	72	80	83	83	81	72	50	39	68
Average ultraviolet index	1.7	2.7	4.6	6.6	8.4	9.8	10.4	9.0	6.6	4.0	2.2	1.4	5.6
Source 1: NOAA (relative humidity and sun 1961–1990)
Source 2: UV Index Today (1995 to 2022)

Climate data for St. George (1991–2020 normals)
Month	Jan	Feb	Mar	Apr	May	Jun	Jul	Aug	Sep	Oct	Nov	Dec	Year
Record high °F (°C)	72 (22)	84 (29)	91 (33)	100 (38)	108 (42)	115 (46)	118 (48)	113 (45)	112 (44)	107 (42)	88 (31)	75 (24)	118 (48)
Mean maximum °F (°C)	65 (18)	70 (21)	81 (27)	90 (32)	98 (37)	106 (41)	110 (43)	107 (42)	103 (39)	92 (33)	76 (24)	64 (18)	110 (43)
Mean daily maximum °F (°C)	55.2 (12.9)	60.1 (15.6)	69.7 (20.9)	76.4 (24.7)	86.3 (30.2)	97.4 (36.3)	102.5 (39.2)	101.0 (38.3)	93.1 (33.9)	79.8 (26.6)	64.7 (18.2)	53.9 (12.2)	77.0 (25.0)
Daily mean °F (°C)	42.8 (6.0)	47.4 (8.6)	55.5 (13.1)	61.9 (16.6)	71.6 (22.0)	81.8 (27.7)	87.8 (31.0)	86.5 (30.3)	78.0 (25.6)	64.5 (18.1)	50.8 (10.4)	42.1 (5.6)	63.1 (17.3)
Mean daily minimum °F (°C)	30.7 (−0.7)	34.7 (1.5)	41.3 (5.2)	47.4 (8.6)	56.7 (13.7)	66.1 (18.9)	73.2 (22.9)	72.0 (22.2)	62.6 (17.0)	49.2 (9.6)	36.9 (2.7)	30.3 (−0.9)	49.2 (9.6)
Mean minimum °F (°C)	21 (−6)	25 (−4)	31 (−1)	38 (3)	45 (7)	55 (13)	66 (19)	64 (18)	52 (11)	38 (3)	27 (−3)	21 (−6)	19 (−7)
Record low °F (°C)	−11 (−24)	1 (−17)	12 (−11)	18 (−8)	20 (−7)	35 (2)	41 (5)	43 (6)	25 (−4)	20 (−7)	4 (−16)	−4 (−20)	−11 (−24)
Average precipitation inches (mm)	1.11 (28)	1.39 (35)	0.90 (23)	0.61 (15)	0.37 (9.4)	0.18 (4.6)	0.54 (14)	0.75 (19)	0.54 (14)	0.65 (17)	0.66 (17)	0.77 (20)	10.08 (256)
Average snowfall inches (cm)	0.4 (1.0)	0.5 (1.3)	0.2 (0.51)	0.0 (0.0)	0.0 (0.0)	0.0 (0.0)	0.0 (0.0)	0.0 (0.0)	0.0 (0.0)	0.0 (0.0)	trace	0.1 (0.25)	1.4 (3.6)
Average precipitation days (≥ 0.01 in)	6	6	5	4	3	1	3	3	2	3	3	5	44
Average snowy days (≥ 0.1 in)	0	0	0	0	0	0	0	0	0	0	0	0	1
Source: NOAA (extremes 1893–present)

Climate data for Cedar City (1971 to 2000)
Month	Jan	Feb	Mar	Apr	May	Jun	Jul	Aug	Sep	Oct	Nov	Dec	Year
Record high °F (°C)	70 (21)	73 (23)	77 (25)	83 (28)	96 (36)	101 (38)	105 (41)	100 (38)	97 (36)	88 (31)	75 (24)	68 (20)	105 (41)
Mean daily maximum °F (°C)	41.8 (5.4)	46.7 (8.2)	53.5 (11.9)	61.2 (16.2)	71.1 (21.7)	83.1 (28.4)	89.4 (31.9)	87.1 (30.6)	78.9 (26.1)	66.1 (18.9)	51.6 (10.9)	42.7 (5.9)	64.4 (18.0)
Mean daily minimum °F (°C)	18.5 (−7.5)	22.8 (−5.1)	28.4 (−2.0)	33.7 (0.9)	41.5 (5.3)	50.1 (10.1)	57.8 (14.3)	56.8 (13.8)	47.6 (8.7)	36.0 (2.2)	25.9 (−3.4)	18.6 (−7.4)	36.5 (2.5)
Record low °F (°C)	−26 (−32)	−24 (−31)	−1 (−18)	6 (−14)	21 (−6)	26 (−3)	40 (4)	36 (2)	23 (−5)	−7 (−22)	−7 (−22)	−23 (−31)	−26 (−32)
Average precipitation inches (mm)	0.90 (23)	0.97 (25)	1.34 (34)	1.00 (25)	0.91 (23)	0.45 (11)	0.93 (24)	1.15 (29)	0.83 (21)	1.30 (33)	0.97 (25)	0.65 (17)	11.4 (290)
Average snowfall inches (cm)	9.1 (23)	9.0 (23)	8.5 (22)	5.2 (13)	1.5 (3.8)	0.1 (0.25)	0 (0)	0 (0)	0.1 (0.25)	2.3 (5.8)	6.1 (15)	6.0 (15)	47.9 (121.1)
Average precipitation days (≥ 0.01 inch)	6.4	6.5	8.8	6.6	6.1	3.2	5.3	6.4	4.7	5.8	5.6	5.8	71.2
Average snowy days (≥ 0.1 inch)	5.1	4.4	4.7	2.9	0.8	0.1	0	0	0.1	1.0	3.2	3.6	25.9
Source: National Oceanic and Atmospheric Administration

Climate data for Provo (1991–2020 normals, extremes 1916–present)
Month	Jan	Feb	Mar	Apr	May	Jun	Jul	Aug	Sep	Oct	Nov	Dec	Year
Record high °F (°C)	63 (17)	73 (23)	84 (29)	89 (32)	98 (37)	105 (41)	108 (42)	107 (42)	101 (38)	90 (32)	77 (25)	72 (22)	108 (42)
Mean maximum °F (°C)	55 (13)	63 (17)	74 (23)	82 (28)	90 (32)	99 (37)	103 (39)	100 (38)	94 (34)	84 (29)	70 (21)	58 (14)	103 (39)
Mean daily maximum °F (°C)	41.0 (5.0)	47.5 (8.6)	58.3 (14.6)	65.5 (18.6)	75.5 (24.2)	87.0 (30.6)	95.0 (35.0)	92.7 (33.7)	82.9 (28.3)	68.4 (20.2)	53.0 (11.7)	41.2 (5.1)	67.3 (19.6)
Daily mean °F (°C)	32.3 (0.2)	37.4 (3.0)	46.3 (7.9)	52.5 (11.4)	61.4 (16.3)	70.9 (21.6)	78.6 (25.9)	76.7 (24.8)	67.3 (19.6)	54.5 (12.5)	42.2 (5.7)	32.7 (0.4)	54.4 (12.4)
Mean daily minimum °F (°C)	23.5 (−4.7)	27.2 (−2.7)	34.3 (1.3)	39.5 (4.2)	47.2 (8.4)	54.7 (12.6)	62.1 (16.7)	60.8 (16.0)	51.8 (11.0)	40.7 (4.8)	31.4 (−0.3)	24.2 (−4.3)	41.5 (5.3)
Mean minimum °F (°C)	8 (−13)	13 (−11)	22 (−6)	28 (−2)	35 (2)	43 (6)	53 (12)	52 (11)	40 (4)	28 (−2)	17 (−8)	10 (−12)	5 (−15)
Record low °F (°C)	−20 (−29)	−20 (−29)	0 (−18)	12 (−11)	27 (−3)	29 (−2)	35 (2)	39 (4)	21 (−6)	11 (−12)	3 (−16)	−30 (−34)	−30 (−34)
Average precipitation inches (mm)	1.95 (50)	1.59 (40)	1.55 (39)	1.95 (50)	1.97 (50)	0.93 (24)	0.51 (13)	0.77 (20)	1.24 (31)	1.59 (40)	1.39 (35)	1.81 (46)	17.23 (438)
Average snowfall inches (cm)	12.5 (32)	8.5 (22)	4.0 (10)	3.1 (7.9)	0.2 (0.51)	0 (0)	0 (0)	0 (0)	0 (0)	0.6 (1.5)	4.5 (11)	12.0 (30)	45.4 (114.91)
Average precipitation days (≥ 0.01 in)	10	9	9	10	9	6	5	5	6	7	8	9	93
Average snowy days (≥ 0.1 in)	6	4	3	2	0	0	0	0	0	0	3	6	24
Percentage possible sunshine	50	55	67	69	71	80	73	79	83	73	50	56	67
Average ultraviolet index	2	3	5	7	9	10	10	9	7	4	3	2	6
Source 1: NOAA
Source 2: Weather Atlas

== Flora and fauna ==
=== Fauna ===
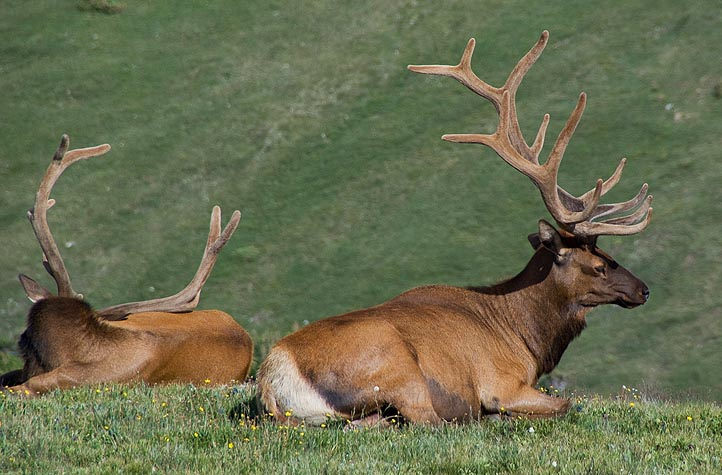
The Rocky Mountain elk is the Utah state mammal.

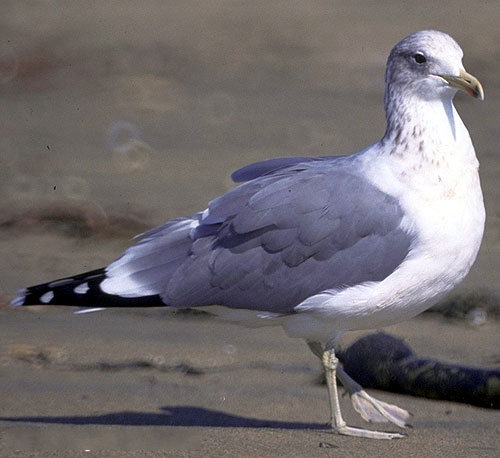
The California gull is the Utah state bird.

Utah is home to more than 600 vertebrate animals as well as numerous invertebrates and insects.

==== Mammals ====
Mammals are found in every area of Utah. Non-predatory larger mammals include the plains bison, elk, moose, mountain goat, mule deer, pronghorn, and multiple types of bighorn sheep. Non-predatory small mammals include muskrat, and nutria. Large and small predatory mammals include the black bear, cougar, Canada lynx, bobcat, fox (gray, red, and kit), coyote, badger, black-footed ferret, mink, stoat, long-tailed weasel, raccoon, and otter.

The brown bear was formerly found within Utah, but has been extirpated. There are no confirmed mating pairs of gray wolf in Utah, though there have been sightings in northeastern Utah along the Wyoming border.

==== Birds ====
As of January 2020, there were 466 species included in the official list managed by the Utah Bird Records Committee (UBRC). Of these, 119 are classed as accidental, 29 are classed as occasional, 57 are classed as rare, and 10 have been introduced to Utah or North America. Eleven of the accidental species are also classed as provisional.

Due to the miracle of the gulls incident in 1848, the most well known bird in Utah is the California gull, which is the Utah state bird. A monument in Salt Lake City commemorates this event, known as the "Miracle of the Gulls". Other gulls common to Utah include Bonaparte's gull, the ring-billed gull, and Franklin's gull.

Other birds commonly found include the American robin, the common starling, finches (black rosy, Cassin's, and goldfinch), the black-billed magpie, mourning doves, sparrows (house, tree, black-chinned, black-throated, Brewer's, and chipping), Clark's grebe, the ferruginous hawk, geese (snow, cackling, and Canada), eagles (golden and bald), California quail, mountain bluebird, and hummingbirds (calliope, black-chinned, and broad-tailed).

==== Invertebrates ====
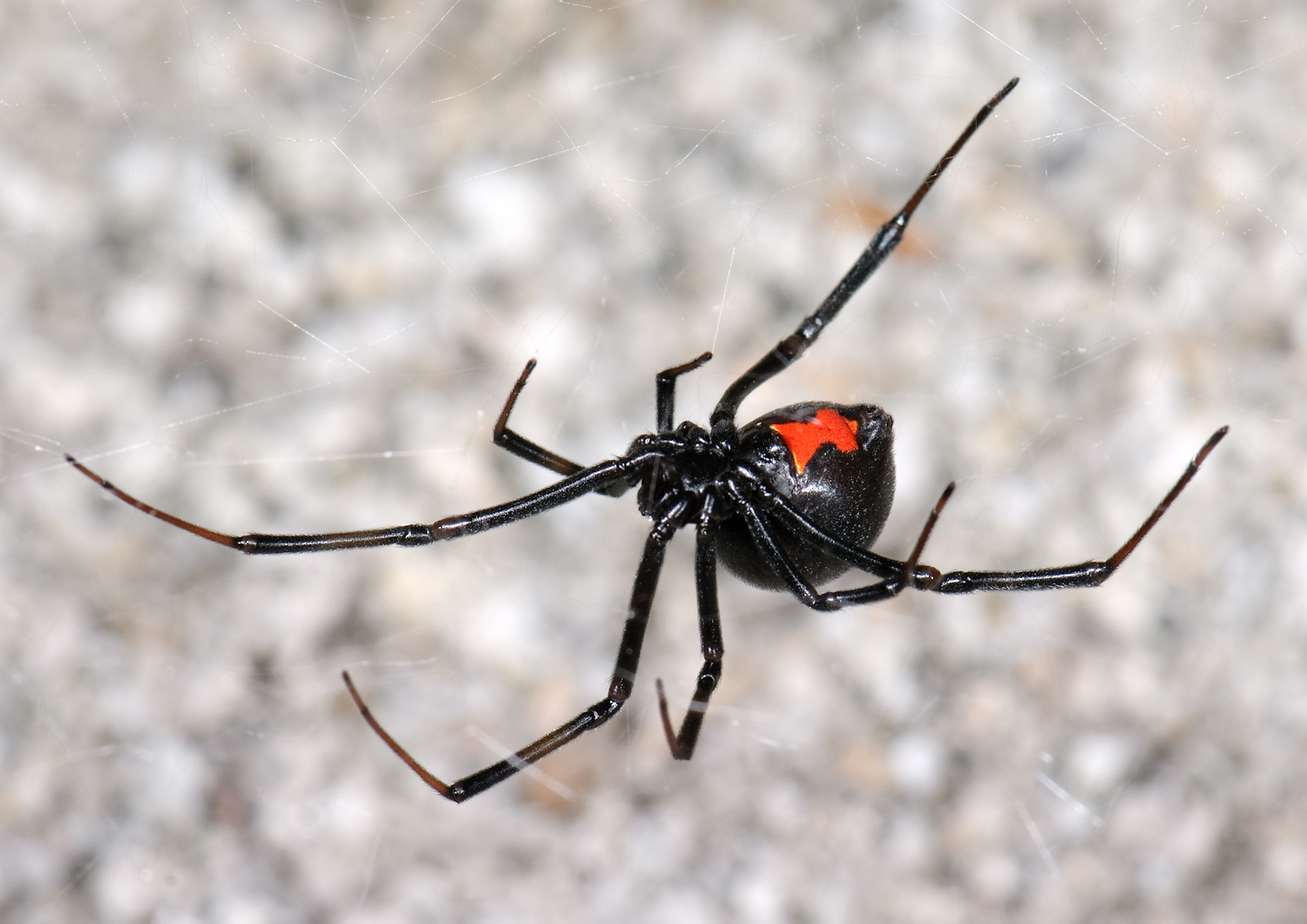
Western black widow spider

Utah is host to a wide variety of arachnids, insects, mollusks, and other invertebrates. Arachnids include the Arizona bark scorpion, Western black widow spiders, crab spiders, hobo spiders (Tegenaria agrestis), cellar spiders, American grass spiders, woodlouse spiders. Several spiders found in Utah are often mistaken for the brown recluse spider, including the desert recluse spider (found only in Washington County), the cellar spider, and crevice weaving spiders. The brown recluse spider has not been officially confirmed in Utah as of summer 2020.

One of the most rare insects in Utah is the Coral Pink Sand Dunes tiger beetle, found only in Coral Pink Sand Dunes State Park, near Kanab. It was proposed in 2012 to be listed as a threatened species, but the proposal was not accepted. Other insects include grasshoppers, green stink bugs, the Army cutworm, the monarch butterfly, and Mormon fritillary butterfly. The white-lined sphinx moth is common to most of the United States, but there have been reported outbreaks of large groups of their larvae damaging tomato, grape and garden crops in Utah. Four or five species of firefly are also found across the state.

In February 2009, Africanized honeybees were found in southern Utah. The bees had spread into eight counties in Utah, as far north as Grand and Emery counties by May 2017.

=== Vegetation ===
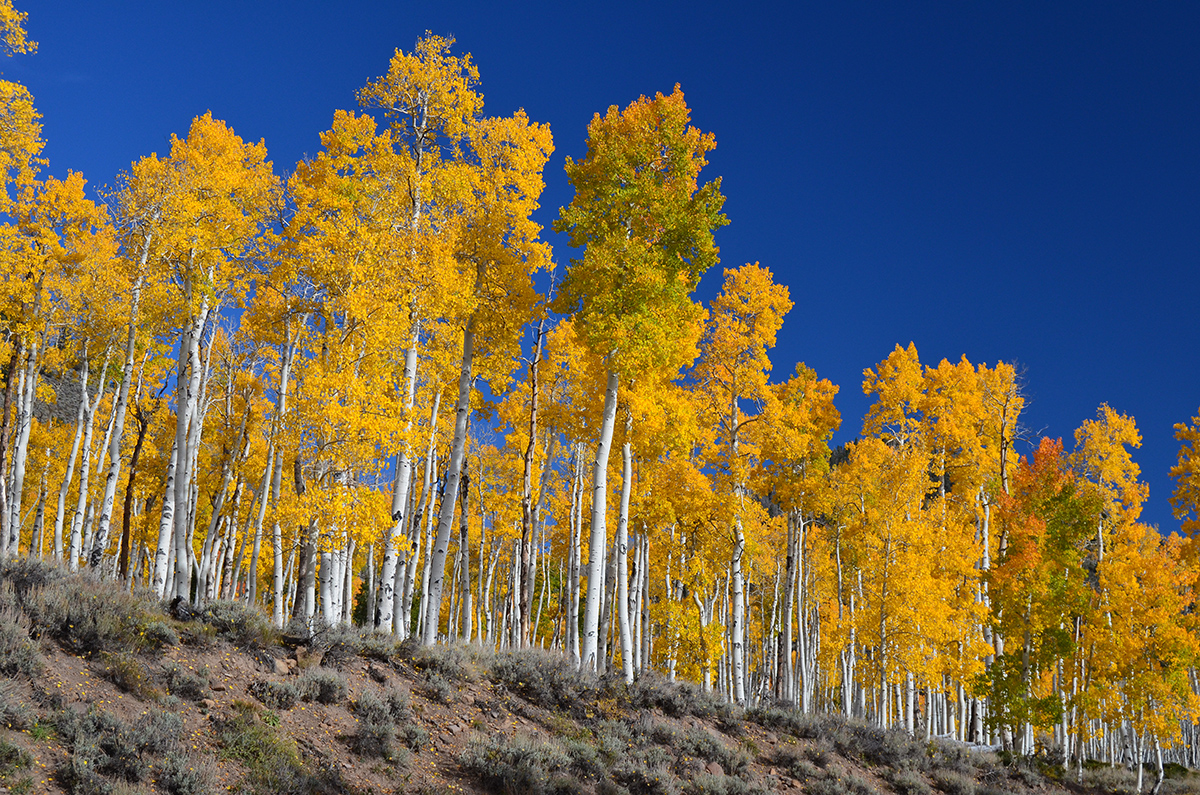
Pando, a single clonal organism in the form of a forest of genetically identical quaking aspen trees with interconnected roots (here showing yellow leaves in the fall) is one of the heaviest and oldest organisms on Earth.

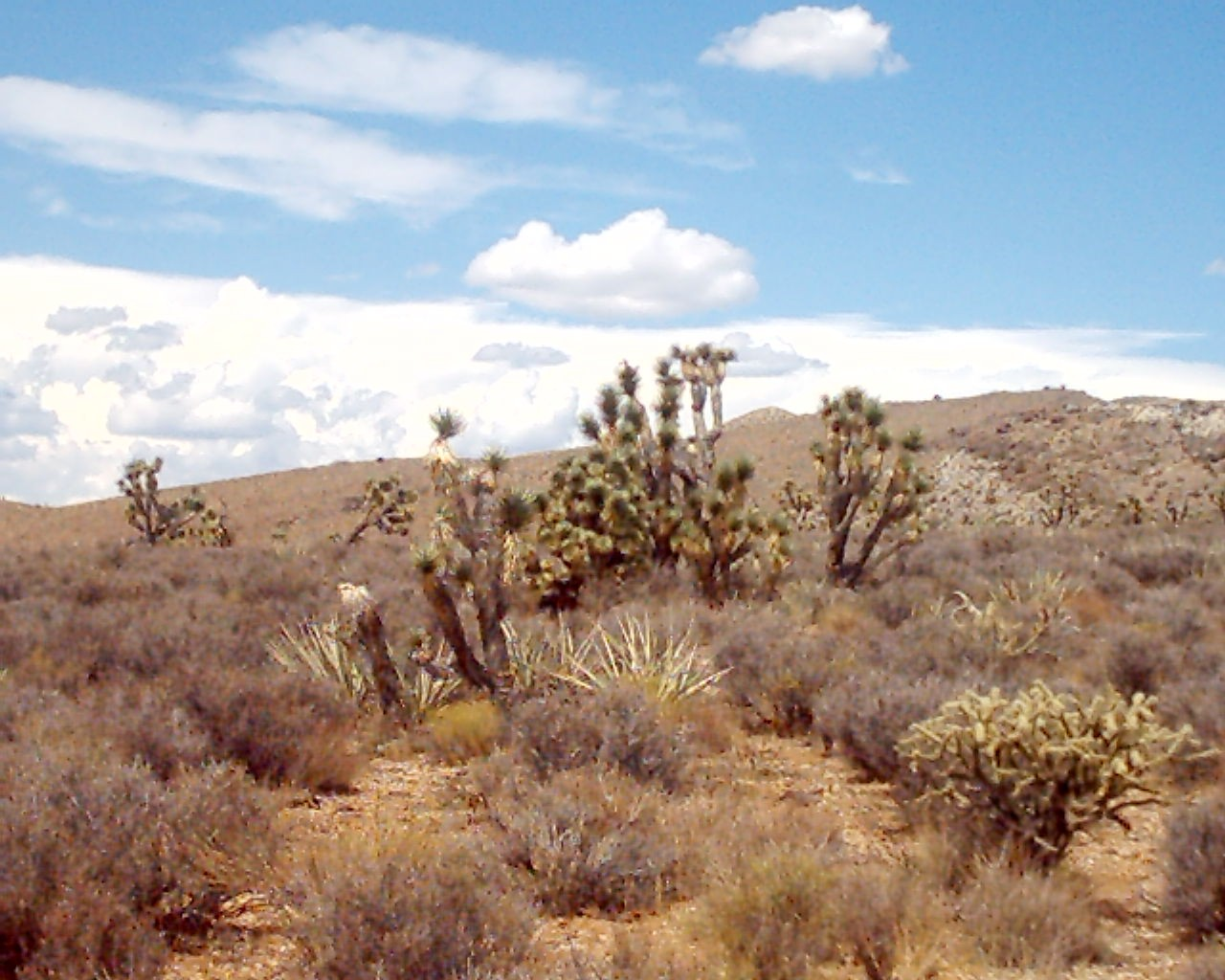
Joshua trees, yuccas, and cholla cactus occupy the far southwest corner of the state in the Mojave Desert

Several thousand plants are native to Utah, including a variety of trees, shrubs, cacti, herbaceous plants, and grasses. As of 2018, there are 3,930 species of plants in Utah, with 3,128 of those being indigenous and 792 being introduced through various means.

Common trees include pines/piñons (white fir, Colorado, single-leaf, Great Basin bristlecone, ponderosa, Engelmann spruce, Rocky Mountain white), and Acer grandidentatum, quaking aspen, bigtooth maple, Utah juniper, speckled alder, red birch, Gambel oak, desert willow, blue spruce, and Joshua trees. Utah has a number of named trees, including the Jardine Juniper, Pando, and the Thousand Mile Tree. Shrubs include a number of different ephedras (pitamoreal, Navajo, Arizona, Nevada, Torrey's jointfir, and green Mormon tea), sagebrushes (little, Bigelow, silver, Michaux's wormwood, black, pygmy, bud, and Great Basin), blue elderberry, Utah serviceberry, chokecherry, and skunkbush sumac. Western poison oak, poison sumac, and western poison ivy are all found in Utah.

There are many varieties of cacti in Utah's varied deserts, especially in the southern and western parts of the state. Some of these include desert prickly pear, California barrel cactus, fishhook cactus, cholla, beavertail prickly pear, and Uinta Basin hookless cactus. Despite the desert climate, many different grasses are found in Utah, including Mormon needlegrass, bluebunch wheatgrass, western alkali grass, squirreltail, desert saltgrass, and cheatgrass.

Several invasive species of plants are considered noxious weeds by the state, including Bermuda grass, field bindweed, henbane, jointed goatgrass, Canada thistle, Balkan and common toadflax, giant cane, couch grass, St. John's wort, hemlock, sword grass, Russian olive, myrtle spurge, Japanese knotweed, salt cedar, and goat's head.

== Gallery ==
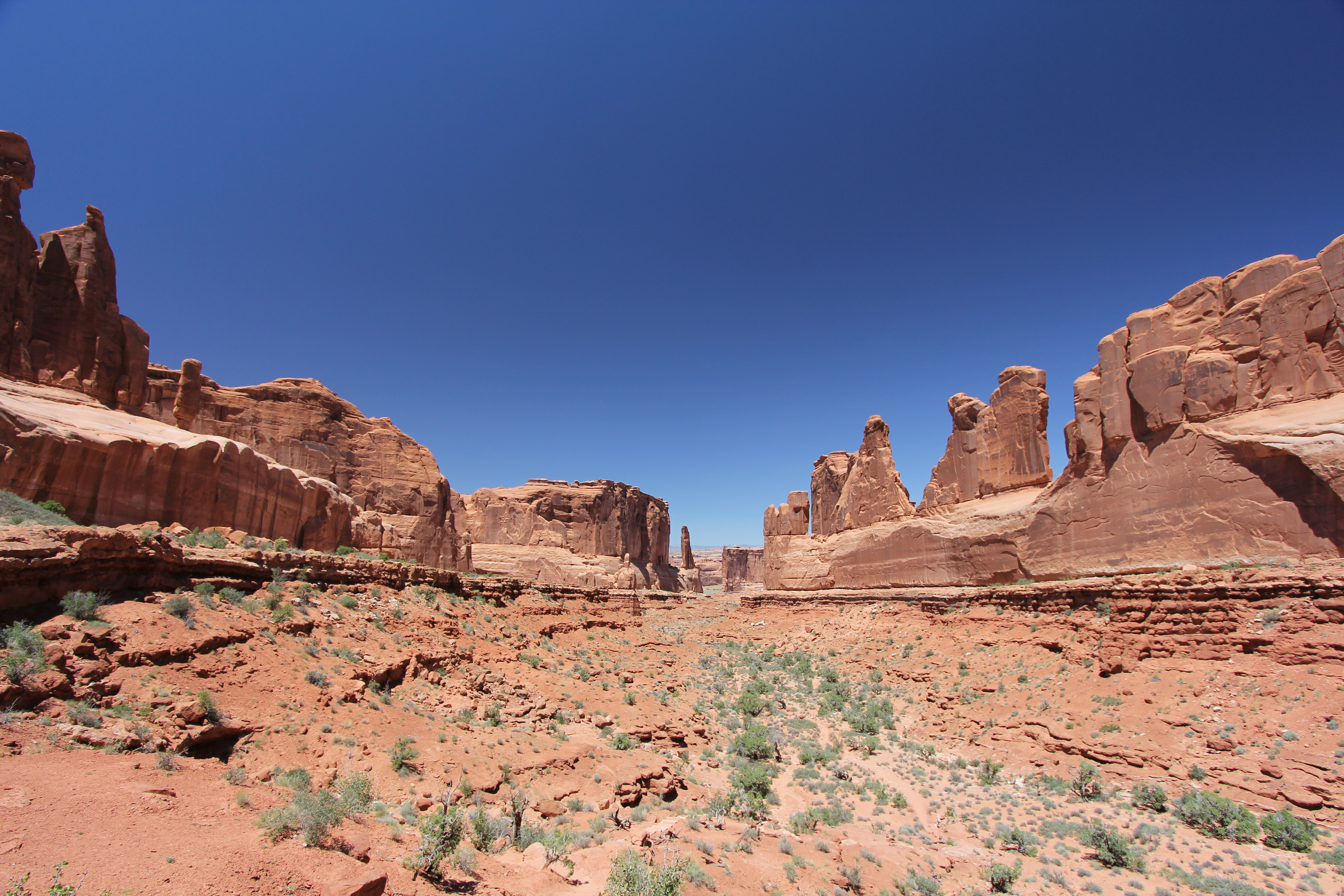
Arches National Park

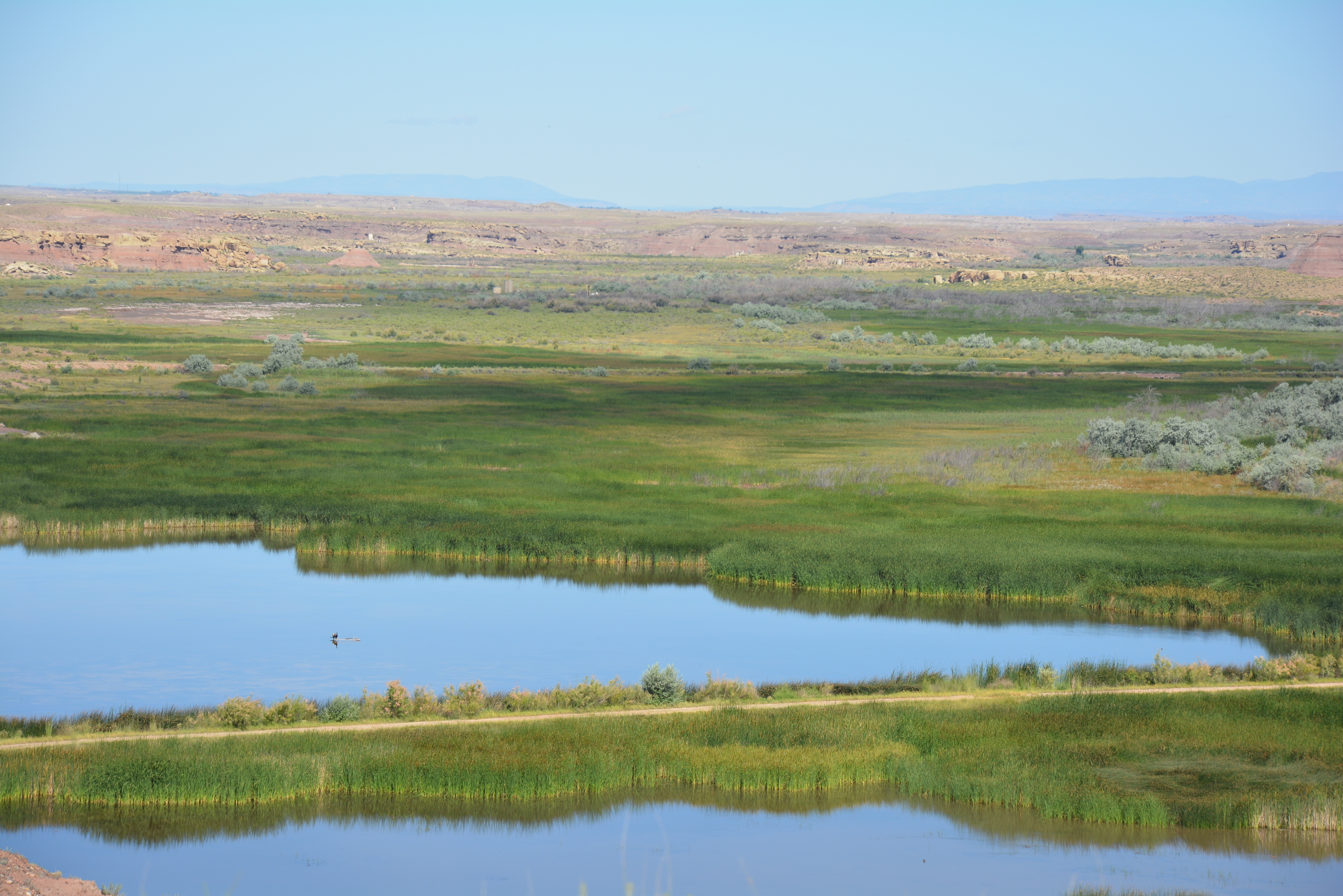
Pariette Wetlands, an oasis in the Uinta Basin

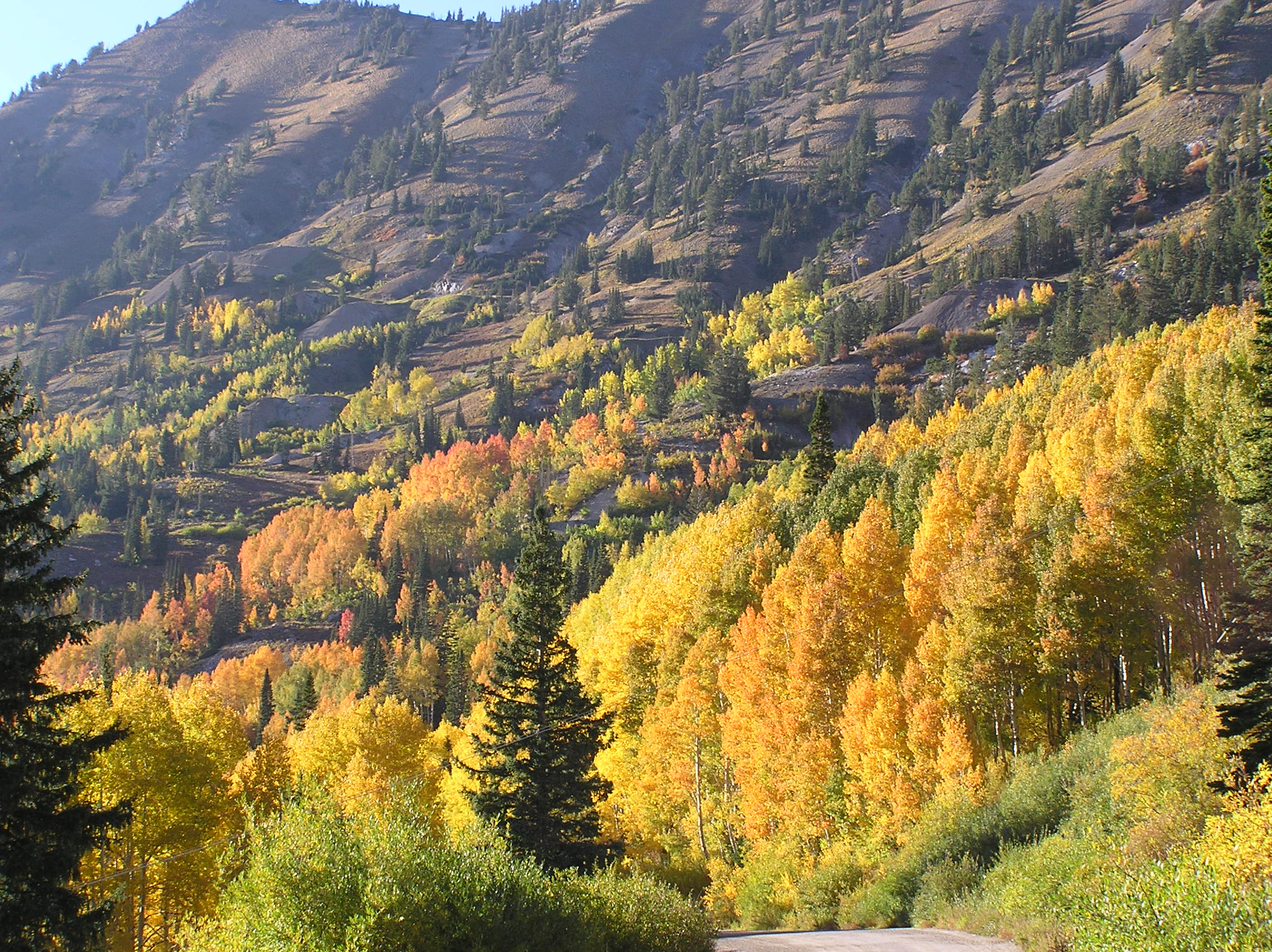
Little Cottonwood Canyon

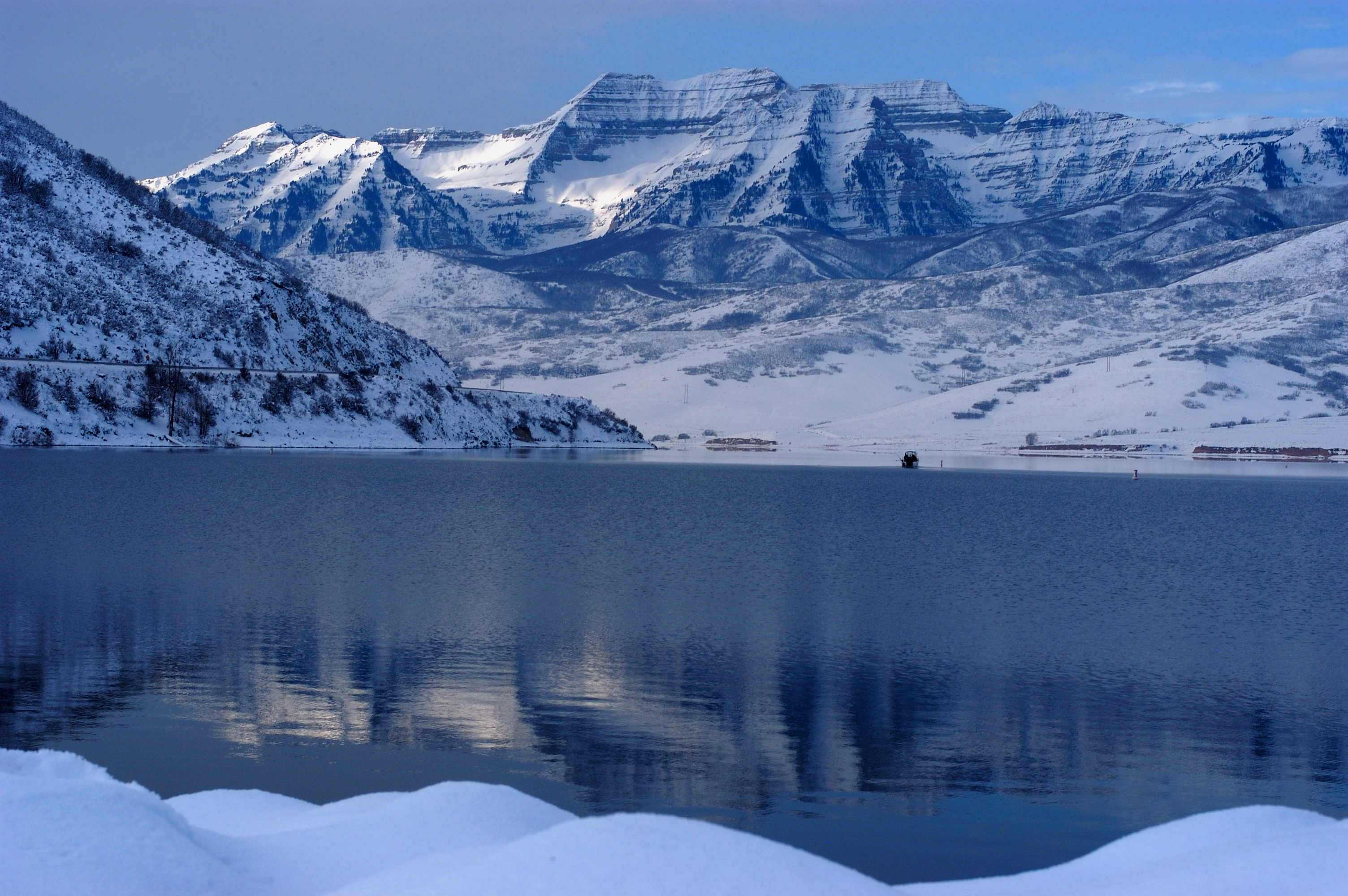
Deer Creek Reservoir

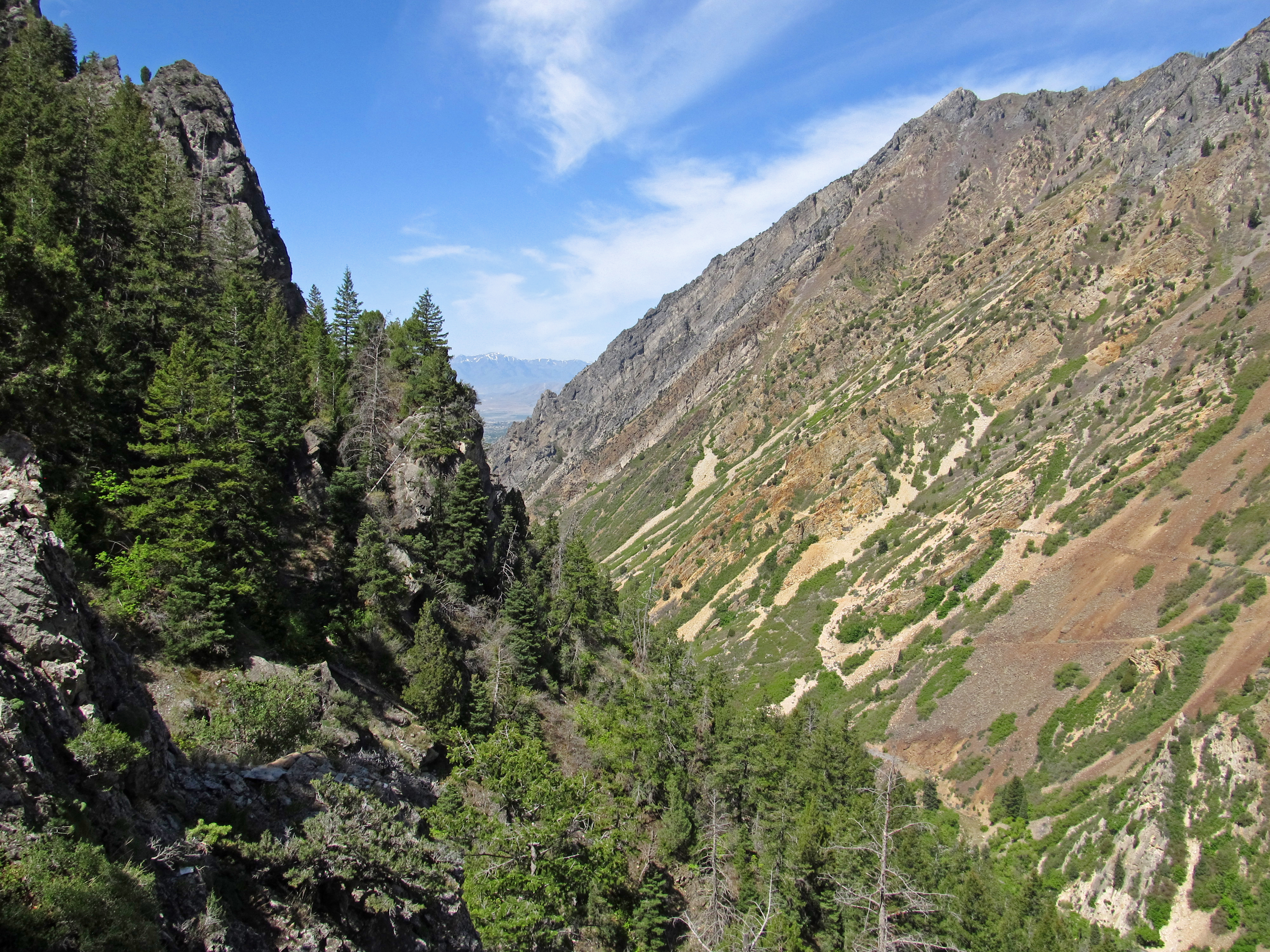
American Fork Canyon

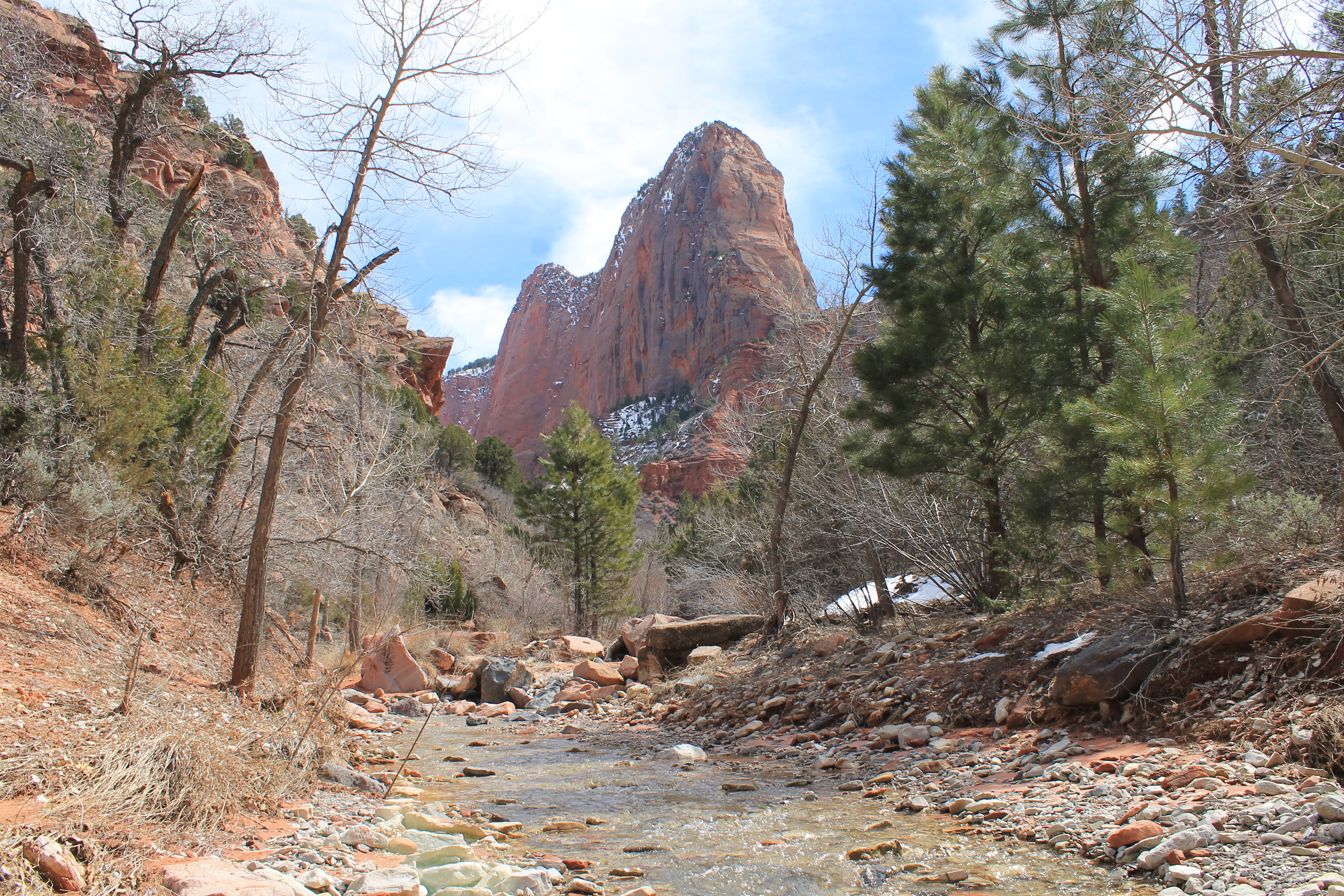
Kolob Canyons at Zion National Park

== See also ==
- List of canyons and gorges in Utah
- List of Utah counties
- List of earthquakes in Utah
