= 2026 Utah House Bill 267 veto referendum =

Utah House Bill 267 veto referendum
- November 3, 2026
- Prohibit Public Sector Union Collective Bargaining Referendum

A veto referendum would have been held on November 3, 2026, on whether to pass or repeal House Bill 267, a 2025 law in the U.S. state of Utah. If approved, House Bill 267 would have prohibited employers from participating in collective bargaining with labor unions in the public sector, including in education, law enforcement, firefighting, and any other position considered to be in the public sector. A yes vote would have been in favor of approving House Bill 267, and a no vote would in favor of repealing House Bill 267.

== Background ==
House Bill 267 passed the Utah House of Representatives in late January 2025, with all Democrats and 18 Republicans in the House voting against it. It passed narrowly in the Utah Senate on February 6 by a vote of 16-13, again with all Democrats and seven Republicans voting against it. Following its passage in both chambers of the legislature, Governor Spencer Cox signed the bill into law on February 14, originally scheduled to go into effect on July 1.

On May 6, Lieutenant Governor Deidre Henderson signed an order blocking enforcement of House Bill 267, following a campaign by Protect Utah Workers collecting over 320,000 signatures across the state, more than the 140,748 required by state law. The target was verified to be reached by the Lieutenant Governor's office on April 28.

In December 2025, the legislature repealed the bill, preventing it from boing on the ballot in 2026.

== Endorsements ==
Yes

State senators

- Kirk Cullimore Jr., Majority Leader of the Utah Senate (2025-present) from the 19th district (2023-present) and 9th district (2019-2023) (Republican)

State representatives

- Jordan Teuscher, state representative from the 44th district (2023-present) and 42nd district (2021-2023) (Republican)

Organizations

- Americans for Prosperity
No

State senators

- Kathleen Riebe, state senator from the 15th district (2023-present) and 8th district (2019-2023) (Democratic)

State representatives

- Raymond Ward, state representative from the 19th district (2015-present) (Republican)

Labor unions

- American Federation of Government Employees
- American Federation of Teachers
- United Mine Workers of America
- Utah Education Association

== Polling ==
Poll source	Date(s) administered	Sample size (Note: Key: A – all adults RV – registered voters LV – likely voters V – unclear)	Margin of error	Yes	No	Undecided
HarrisX	May 16-21, 2025	805 (RV)	± 3.5%	32%	36%	31%
