= Allium bigelovii =

New Mexico wild leek

Conservation status
- Vulnerable (NatureServe)

Scientific classification
- Kingdom: Plantae
- Clade: Tracheophytes
- Clade: Angiosperms
- Clade: Monocots
- Order: Asparagales
- Family: Amaryllidaceae
- Subfamily: Allioideae
- Genus: Allium
- Subgenus: A. subg. Amerallium
- Species: A. bigelovii

Binomial name
- Allium bigelovii S.Wats.

Synonyms
- Allium bigelowii S.Wats., alternate spelling

Species of flowering plant

Allium bigelovii, the New Mexico wild leek, is a plant species native to Arizona and southwestern New Mexico. It grows on open, gravelly slopes at elevations of 500–1,700 m (1,600–5,600 ft).

The specific epithet honors John Milton Bigelow (based on the Latinized form of his surname, Bigelovius).

Allium bigelovii has spherical bulbs about 15 mm (0.59 in) in diameter. Leaves are up to 25 cm (9.8 in) long. Flower bell-shaped, about 15 mm (0.59 in) long; ovary bears a prominent crest; tepals white with pink tips and red midveins.
