= Amaranthus bigelovii =

Bigelow's amaranth

Scientific classification
- Kingdom: Plantae
- Clade: Tracheophytes
- Clade: Angiosperms
- Clade: Eudicots
- Order: Caryophyllales
- Family: Amaranthaceae
- Genus: Amaranthus
- Species: A. bigelovii

Binomial name
- Amaranthus bigelovii Uline & W.L.Bray

Species of flowering plant

Amaranthus bigelovii is a flowering plant commonly known as Bigelow's amaranth. It is an annual plant native to New Mexico, Texas, and Louisiana.
