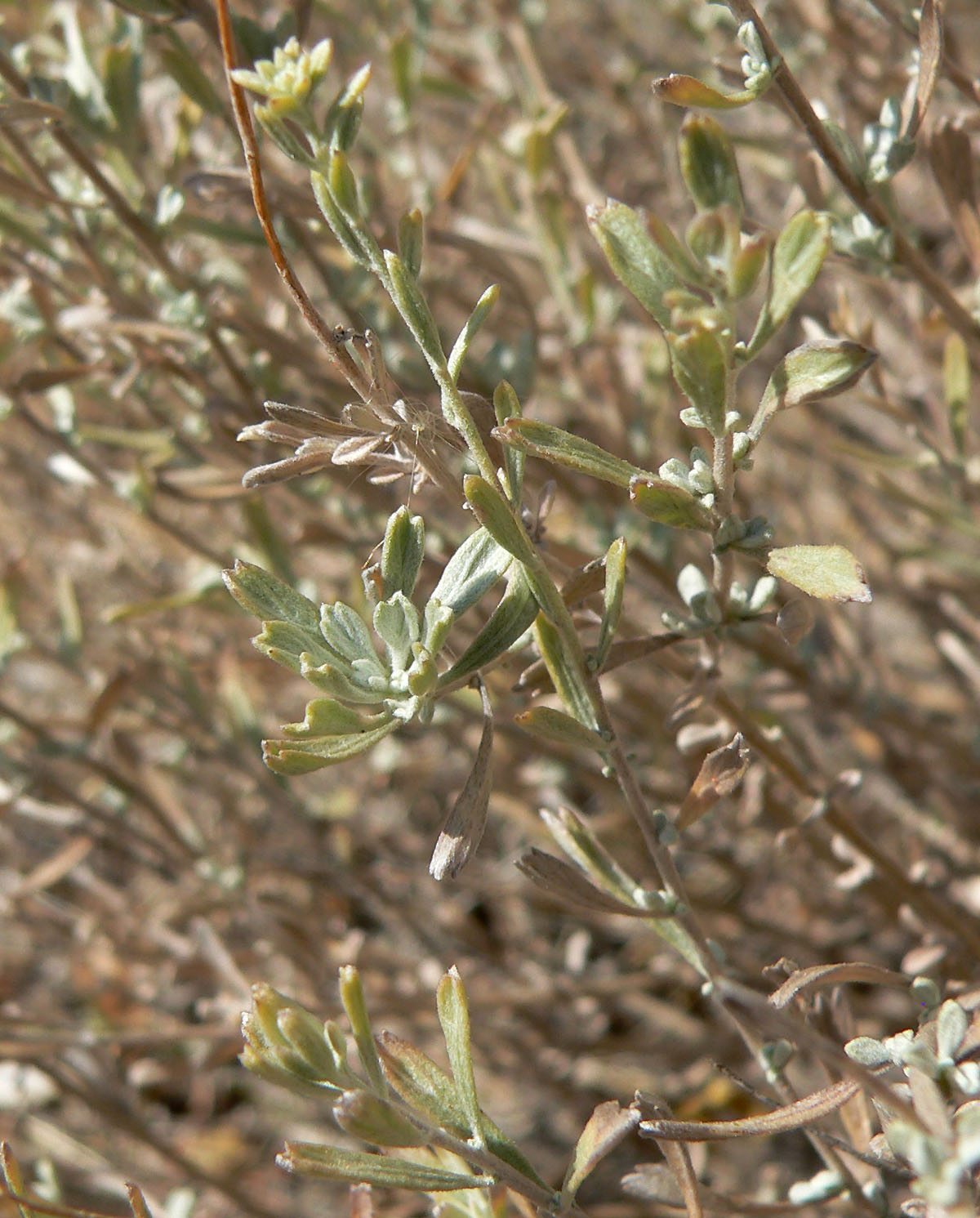

Conservation status
- Secure (NatureServe)

Scientific classification
- Kingdom: Plantae
- Clade: Tracheophytes
- Clade: Angiosperms
- Clade: Eudicots
- Clade: Asterids
- Order: Asterales
- Family: Asteraceae
- Genus: Artemisia
- Species: A. bigelovii

Binomial name
- Artemisia bigelovii A.Gray

Synonyms
- Artemisia petrophila Wooton & Standl.; Seriphidium bigelowii (A.Gray) K.Bremer & Humphries, alternate spelling; Seriphidium bigelovii (A.Gray) K.Bremer & Humphries; Artemisia bigelowii A.Gray, alternate spelling

= Artemisia bigelovii =

Species of flowering plant

Artemisia bigelovii is a North American species of sagebrush known by the common name Bigelow sagebrush or flat sagebrush. It grows in the deserts of the southwestern United States.

== Distribution ==
It is native to California (Inyo + San Bernardino Counties), Arizona, Nevada, Utah, Colorado, New Mexico, and Texas. It grows in desert, basin, grassland, and juniper woodland habitats. It is very drought-tolerant and lives in arid regions on sandy and limestone-rich soils.

== Description ==
Artemisia bigelovii is a shrub growing from a woody base and reaching a maximum height around 50 cm (20 inches). It has many slender, curving branches with shredding bark and is generally in overall habit.

The stem branches and leaves are coated in silvery hairs, giving the plant a gray color. The leaves are less than 3 centimeters long and may end in a point or in three distinct teeth.

The inflorescence is a panicle of flower heads containing yellowish disc florets and occasionally a small ray floret. The fruit is a tiny achene about a millimeter long.

== Uses ==
This species of sagebrush is good winter fodder for grazing animals and it is cultivated as plant cover on recovering rangeland and for erosion control.
