= Outline of Utah =

U.S. state

The flag of Utah

The seal of Utah

The location of the state of Utah in the United States of America

The following outline is provided as an overview of and topical guide to Utah:

Utah – state in the Western United States. It became the 45th state admitted to the Union on January 4, 1896. Utah is the 13th-largest, the 34th-most populous, and the 10th-least-densely populated of the 50 United States. Approximately 80% of Utah's 2,817,222 people live along the Wasatch Front, centering on Salt Lake City, leaving vast expanses of the state nearly uninhabited and making the population the sixth most urbanized in the U.S. Utah is the most religiously homogeneous state in the Union. Approximately 63% of Utahns are reported to be members of the Church of Jesus Christ of Latter-day Saints or LDS (Mormons), which greatly influences Utah culture and daily life. The world headquarters of the Church of Jesus Christ of Latter-day Saints (LDS Church) is located in Utah's state capital.

== General reference ==
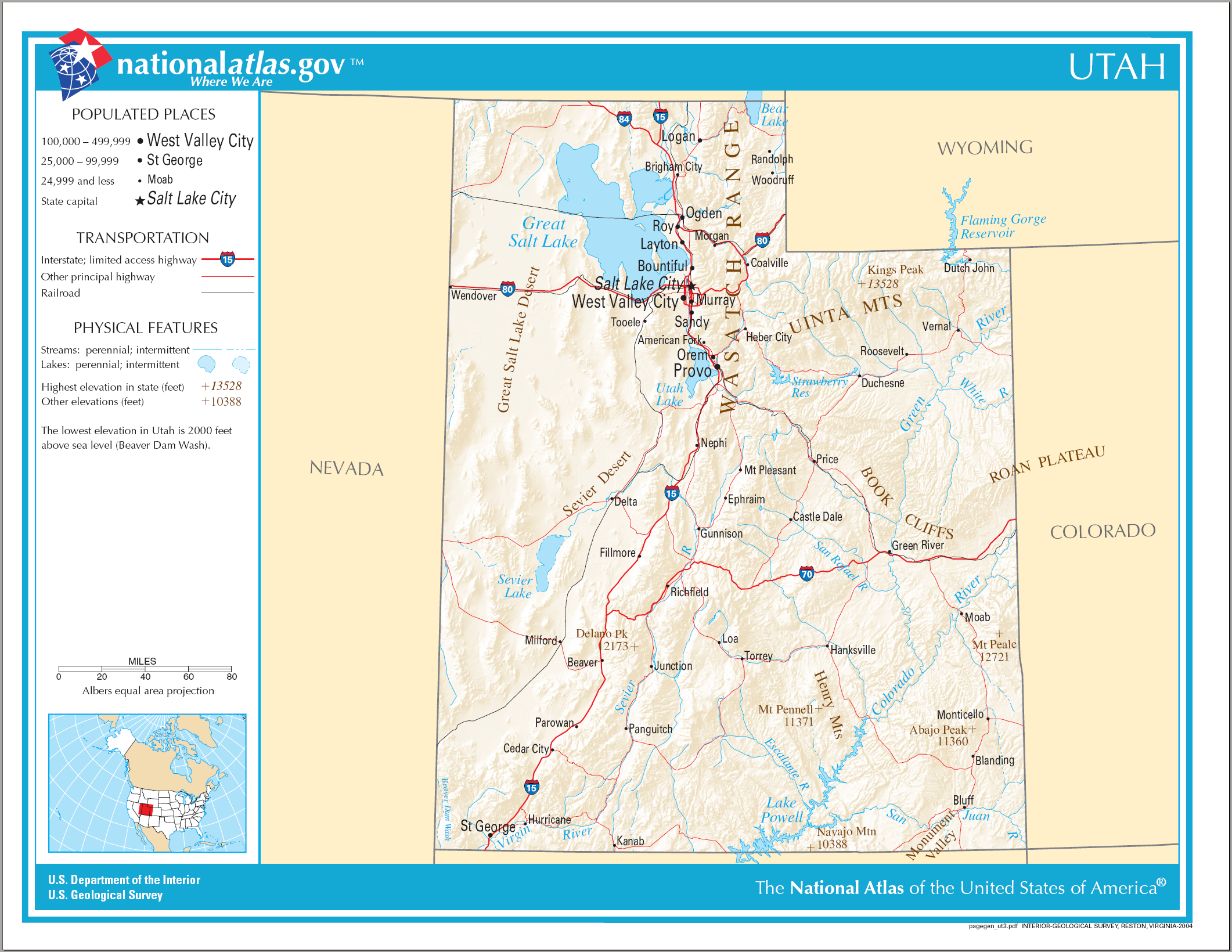
An enlargeable map of the state of Utah

- Names
  - Common name: Utah
    - /ˈjuːtɔː/ or /ˈjuːtɑː/
  - Official name: State of Utah
  - Abbreviations and name codes
    - Postal symbol: UT
    - ISO 3166-2 code: US-UT
    - Internet second-level domain: .ut.us
  - Nicknames
    - Beehive State
    - Mormon State
    - Friendly State (in disuse) (formerly used on license plates)
    - Greatest Snow on Earth (formerly used on all license plates; now an alternate slogan on license plates alongside the state's current tourism slogan, "Life Elevated")
- Adjectival: Utah
- Demonyms
  - Utahn
  - Utahan

== Geography of Utah ==
Geography of Utah

- Utah is: a U.S. state, a federal state of the United States of America
- Location
  - Northern Hemisphere
  - Western Hemisphere
    - Americas
      - North America
        - Anglo America
        - Northern America
          - United States of America
            - Contiguous United States
              - Western United States
                - Mountain West United States
                - Southwestern United States
- Population of Utah: 2,763,885 (2010 U.S. Census)
- Area of Utah: 84,899 sq mi (219,887 km^{2})
- Atlas of Utah

=== Places in Utah ===
- Historic places in Utah
  - Abandoned communities in Utah
    - Ghost towns in Utah
  - National Historic Landmarks in Utah
  - National Register of Historic Places listings in Utah
    - Bridges on the National Register of Historic Places in Utah
- National Natural Landmarks in Utah
- National parks in Utah
- State parks in Utah

=== Environment of Utah ===
- Climate of Utah
- Superfund sites in Utah
- Wildlife of Utah
  - Fauna of Utah
    - Birds of Utah

==== Natural geographic features of Utah ====
- Mountain ranges of Utah
- Plateaus of Utah
- Rivers of Utah
- Valleys of Utah

=== Regions of Utah ===
- Northern Utah
- Southern Utah

==== Administrative divisions of Utah ====
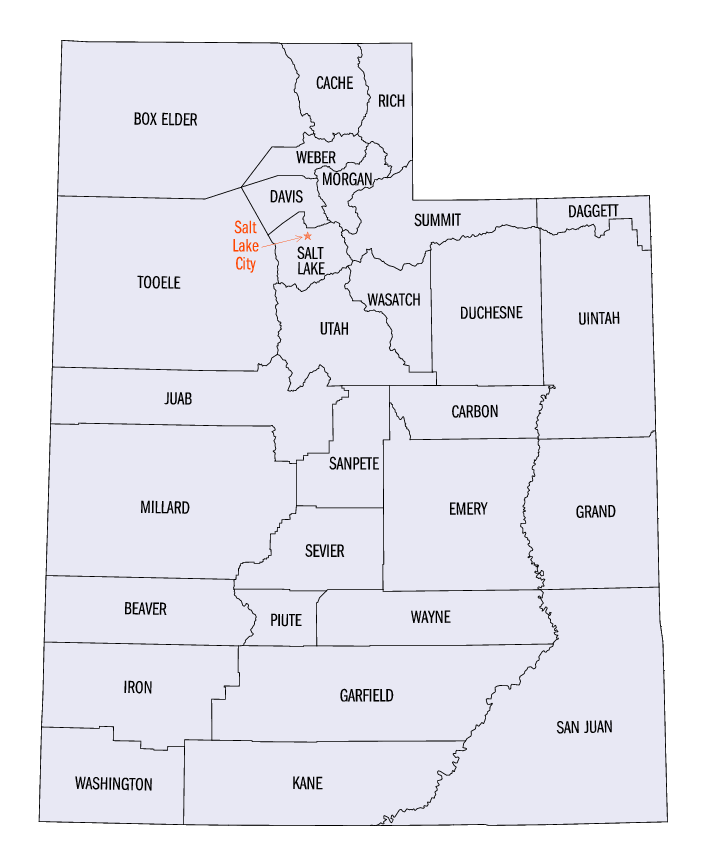
An enlargeable map of the 29 counties of the state of Utah

- The 29 counties of the state of Utah
  - Municipalities in Utah
    - Cities in Utah
      - State capital of Utah: Salt Lake City
      - Largest city of Utah: Salt Lake City
      - City nicknames in Utah

=== Demography of Utah ===
Demographics of Utah

== Government and politics of Utah ==
Politics of Utah

- Form of government: U.S. state government
- Utah's congressional delegations
- Utah State Capitol
- Elections in Utah
- Political party strength in Utah
- Utah Transfer of Public Lands Act, passed 2012, becomes effective 31 December 2014

=== Branches of the government of Utah ===
Government of Utah

==== Executive branch of the government of Utah ====
- Governor of Utah
  - Lieutenant Governor of Utah
- State departments
  - Utah Department of Transportation

==== Legislative branch of the government of Utah ====
- Utah State Legislature (bicameral)
  - Upper house: Utah Senate
  - Lower house: Utah House of Representatives

==== Judicial branch of the government of Utah ====
Courts of Utah

- Supreme Court of Utah

=== Law and order in Utah ===
Law of Utah

- Cannabis in Utah
- Capital punishment in Utah
  - Individuals executed in Utah
- Constitution of Utah
- Crime in Utah
- Gun laws in Utah
- Law enforcement in Utah
  - Law enforcement agencies in Utah
- Same-sex marriage in Utah

=== Military in Utah ===
- Utah Air National Guard
- Utah Army National Guard

== History of Utah ==
History of Utah

=== History of Utah, by period ===
- Indigenous peoples
- Domínguez–Escalante expedition, 1776
- Adams–Onís Treaty of 1819
- Mexican War of Independence, September 16, 1810 – August 24, 1821
  - Treaty of Córdoba, August 24, 1821
- Mexican–American War, April 25, 1846 – February 2, 1848
  - Treaty of Guadalupe Hidalgo, February 2, 1848
- Mormon settlement, 1847–1861
  - Mormon Trail, 1847–1869
  - Mormon handcart pioneers, 1856–1860
- Unorganized territory of the United States, 1848–1850
  - State of Deseret (extralegal), 1849–1850
- Territory of Utah, 1850–1896
  - Compromise of 1850
  - Walker War, 1853–1854
  - Tintic War, 1856
  - Mountain Meadows Massacre, 1857
  - Jefferson Territory (extralegal), 1859–1861
  - Pony Express, 1860–1861
  - American Civil War, April 12, 1861 – May 13, 1865
    - Utah in the American Civil War
  - First Transcontinental Telegraph completed 1861
  - Morrisite War, 1862
  - Black Hawk War, 1865–1872
  - History of women's suffrage in Utah
  - First transcontinental railroad completed on May 10, 1869
  - Powell Geographic Expedition of 1869
- State of Utah becomes 45th State admitted to the United States of America on January 4, 1896
  - Zion National Park established on November 19, 1919
  - Utah National Park established on June 7, 1924
  - Utah National Park renamed Bryce Canyon National Park on February 25, 1928
  - Canyonlands National Park established on September 12, 1964
  - Arches National Park established on November 12, 1971
  - Capitol Reef National Park established on December 18, 1971
  - XIX Olympic Winter Games, 2002

== Culture of Utah ==
Culture of Utah

- Museums in Utah
- Religion in Utah
  - The Church of Jesus Christ of Latter-day Saints in Utah
  - Episcopal Diocese of Utah
- Scouting in Utah
- State symbols of Utah
  - Flag of the State of Utah
  - Great Seal of the State of Utah

=== The arts in Utah ===
- Music of Utah

=== Sports in Utah ===
Sports in Utah

- Professional sports teams in Utah

== Economy and infrastructure of Utah ==
Economy of Utah

- Communications in Utah
  - Newspapers in Utah
  - Radio stations in Utah
  - Television stations in Utah
- Energy in Utah
  - List of power stations in Utah
  - Solar power in Utah
  - Uranium mining in Utah
  - Wind power in Utah
- Health care in Utah
  - Hospitals in Utah
- Transportation in Utah
  - Airports in Utah
  - Roads in Utah
    - State highways in Utah

== Education in Utah ==
Education in Utah

- Schools in Utah
  - School districts in Utah
    - High schools in Utah
  - Colleges and universities in Utah
    - Utah System of Higher Education

== See also ==
- Topic overview:
  - Utah
  - Index of Utah-related articles
