= History of Utah =

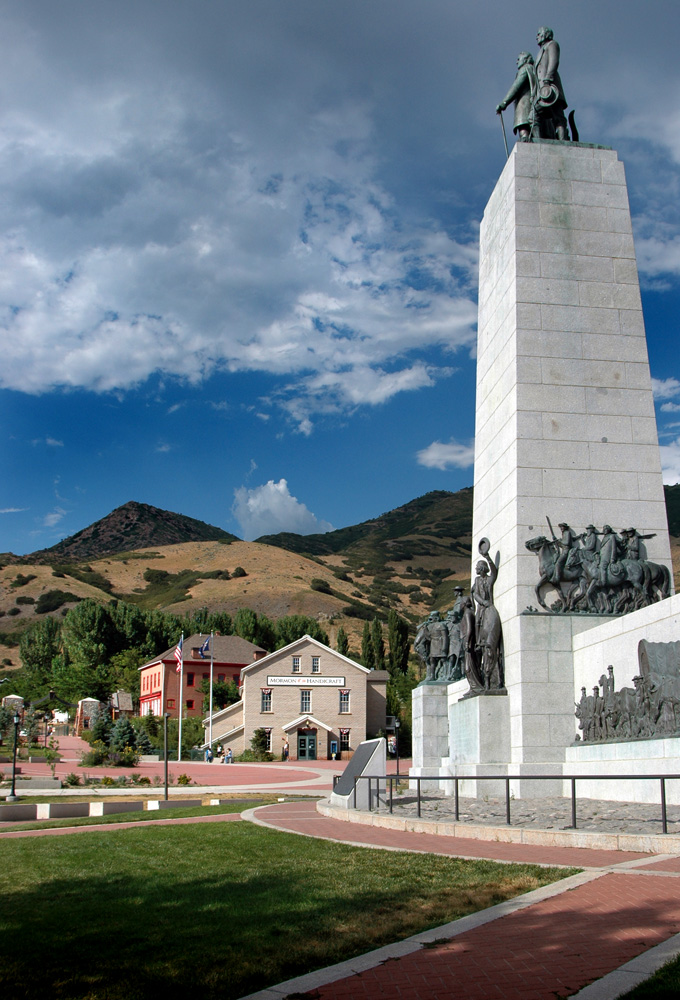
Location where the Mormons entered the Salt Lake Valley in 1847, now the This is the Place Monument and Deseret Village

The History of Utah is an examination of the human history and social activity within the state of Utah located in the western United States. The written history of Utah begins with archeological explorations of the state's earliest inhabitants, from an estimated 12,000 years ago. Other archeological and historical analysis looks at established cultural periods of change and technological development, where the Fremont and Ancestral Puebloan cultures thrived. Written history of Utah also includes the early historic Native American tribes from Utah, who were impacted by European exploration on the part of the Spanish and settler colonialism on the part of members from the Church of Jesus Christ of Latter-day Saints. As Church members, also called "Mormons," assimilated back into US culture, the area now called Utah transformed from Mexican territory into US territory, eventually achieving statehood in 1896. Since the nineteenth century, Utah history has been defined by many themes pertinent to US and American West history broadly: agricultural changes, massive industrialization, immigration and cultural exchange, economic hardship from the Great Depression, World War II and the postwar economic boom, and a greater incorporation into the global economy's financial and tech sectors by the late 1990s.

== Prehistory ==
Archaeological evidence dates the earliest habitation of humans in Utah to about 10,000 to 12,000 years ago. People lived near the Great Basin's swamps and marshes, which has a history of fish, birds, and small game animals. Big game, including bison, mammoths and ground sloths, also were attracted to these water sources. Over the centuries, the mega-fauna died, this population was replaced by the Desert Archaic people, who sheltered in caves near the Great Salt Lake. Relying more on gathering than the previous Utah residents, their diet was mainly composed of cattails and other salt tolerant plants such as pickleweed, burro weed and sedge. Red meat appears to have been more of a luxury, although these people used nets and the atlatl to hunt water fowl, ducks, small animals and antelope. Artifacts include nets woven with plant fibers and rabbit skin, woven sandals, gaming sticks, and animal figures made from split-twigs.

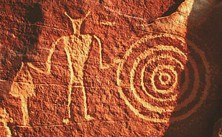
Fremont petroglyph, Dinosaur National Monument

The Fremont culture, named from sites near the Fremont River in Utah, lived in what is now north and western Utah and parts of Nevada, Idaho and Colorado from approximately 300 to 1300 AD. The term "Fremont" is used by archeologists to refer to a diverse collection of communities that varied considerably by region. The use of new technologies defining this period of Fremont culture include:

- use of the bow and arrow while hunting,
- building pithouse shelters,
- growing maize and probably beans and squash,
- building above ground granaries of adobe or stone,
- creating and decorating low-fired pottery ware,
- producing art, including jewelry and rock art such as petroglyphs and pictographs.

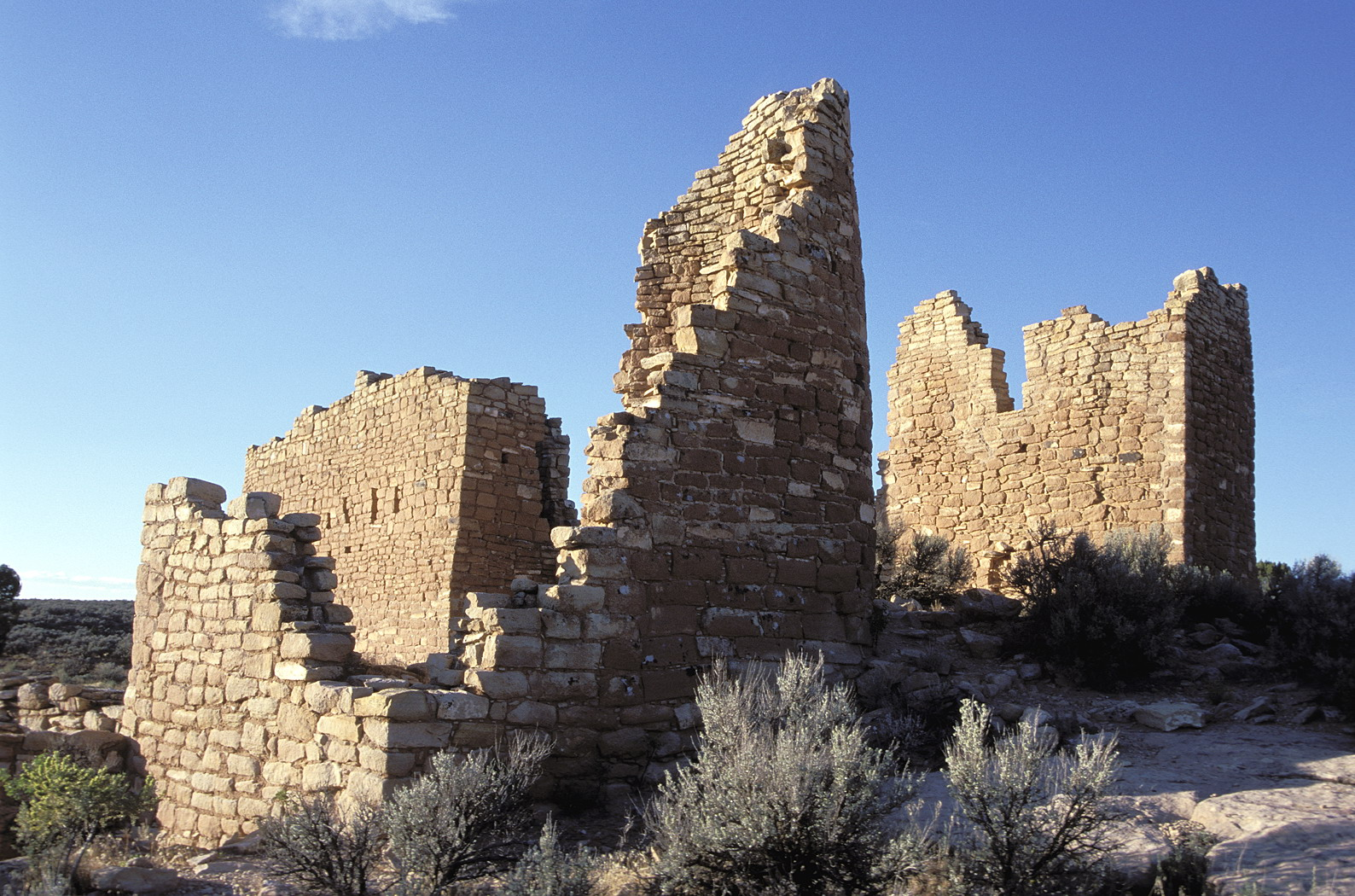
Hovenweep Castle, San Juan River basin

The Ancestral Puebloan culture, formerly known as the Anasazi, occupied territory near the present-day Four Corners area of the Southwest United States, including the San Juan River region of Utah. Ancestral Puebloan communities experienced periods of population growth and architectural development between approximately 500 and 1200 CE, although the timing and character of these changes varied greatly by region.

Ancient Puebloan culture is known for well constructed pithouses and more elaborate adobe and masonry dwellings. They were excellent craftsmen, producing turquoise jewelry and fine pottery. The Puebloan culture was based on agriculture, and the people created and cultivated fields of maize, beans, and squash and domesticated turkeys. Some communities designed and produced elaborate field terracing and irrigation systems. They also built structures, some known as kivas, apparently designed solely for cultural and religious rituals.

During the late thirteenth century, the Ancestral Puebloan populations began leaving southeastern Utah and the Mesa Verde region. Changing climate and agricultural challneges likely contrbuted to this movement. The descendants of Ancestral Puebloans continue to live today in Arizona, Texas, and New Mexico.

== Early historic Native Americans ==
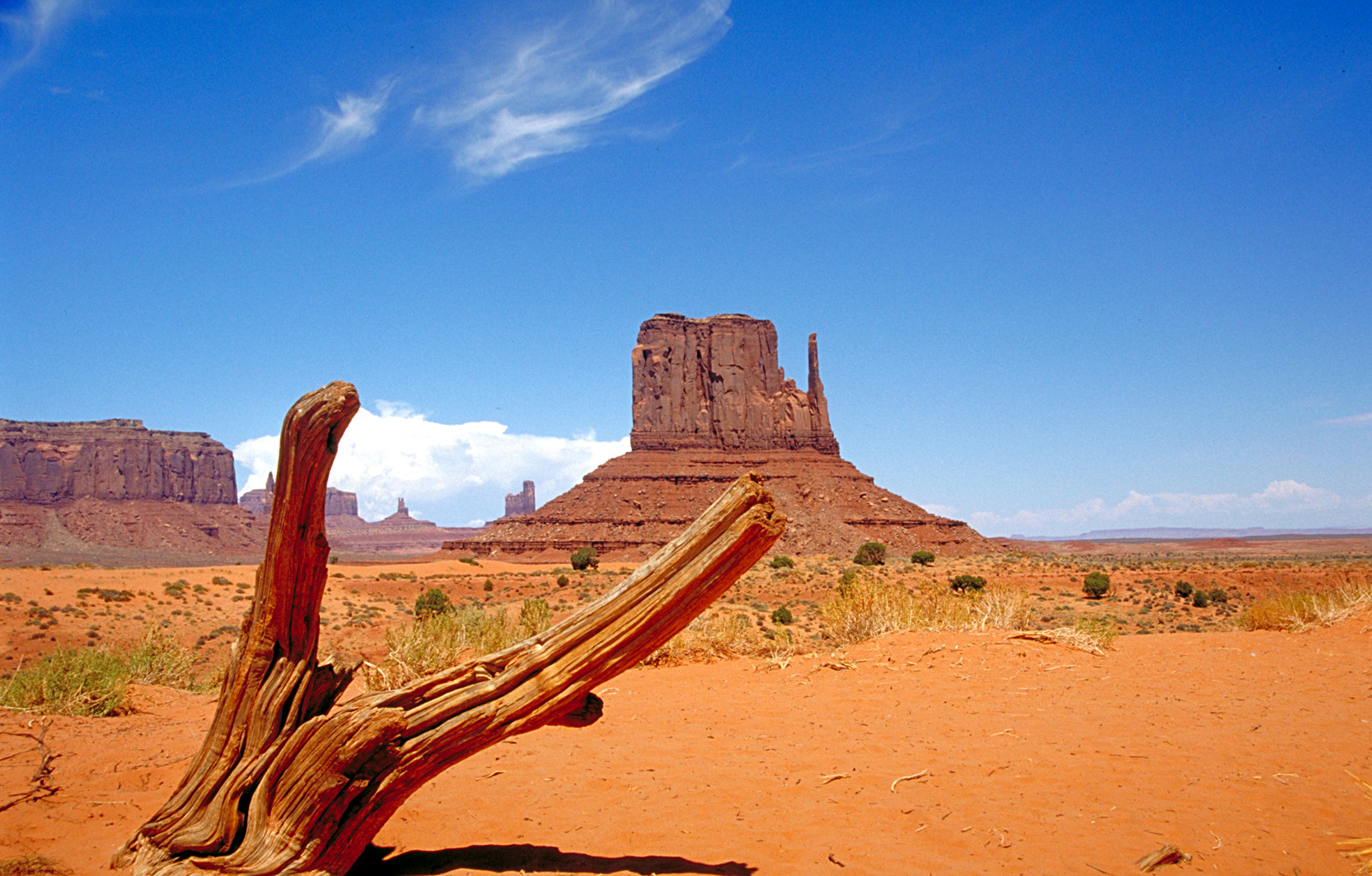
Navajo homeland in Monument Valley

In about 1200, Numic, or Shoshonean-speaking, peoples entered Utah territory from the west, originating in southern California. Four main Numic peoples inhabited Utah country. The Shoshone in the north and northeast, the Goshutes in the northwest, the Utes in the central and eastern parts of the region and the Southern Paiutes in the southwest. Intertribal contact among these groups was frequent given their shared linguistic roots. Seasonal gatherings and communal activities such as hunting made early Utah's Numic community relations interconnected, dynamic, and socially complex.

Between 1400 and 1500, the San Juan River basin in Utah's southeast also saw a new people, the Díne or Navajo, part of a greater group of plains Athabaskan speakers moved into the Southwest from Canada. In addition to the Navajo, this language group contained people that were later known as Apaches, including the Lipan, Jicarilla, and Mescalero Apaches. The Athabaskans expanded their range throughout the 17th century, occupying areas the Pueblo peoples had abandoned during prior centuries. The Spanish first specifically mention the "Apachu de Nabajo" (Navaho) in the 1620s, referring to the people in the Chama valley region east of the San Juan River, and north west of Santa Fe. By the 1640s, the term "Navaho" was applied to these same people. Although the Navajo newcomers established a generally peaceful trading and cultural exchange with the some modern Pueblo peoples to the south, they experienced intermittent warfare with the Shoshonean peoples, particularly the Utes in eastern Utah and western Colorado.

At the time of European expansion, beginning with Spanish explorers traveling from Mexico, five distinct native peoples occupied territory within the Utah area: the Northern Shoshone, the Goshute, the Ute, the Paiute and the Navajo. These peoples remain a core part of Utah culture and identity today.

== European exploration ==
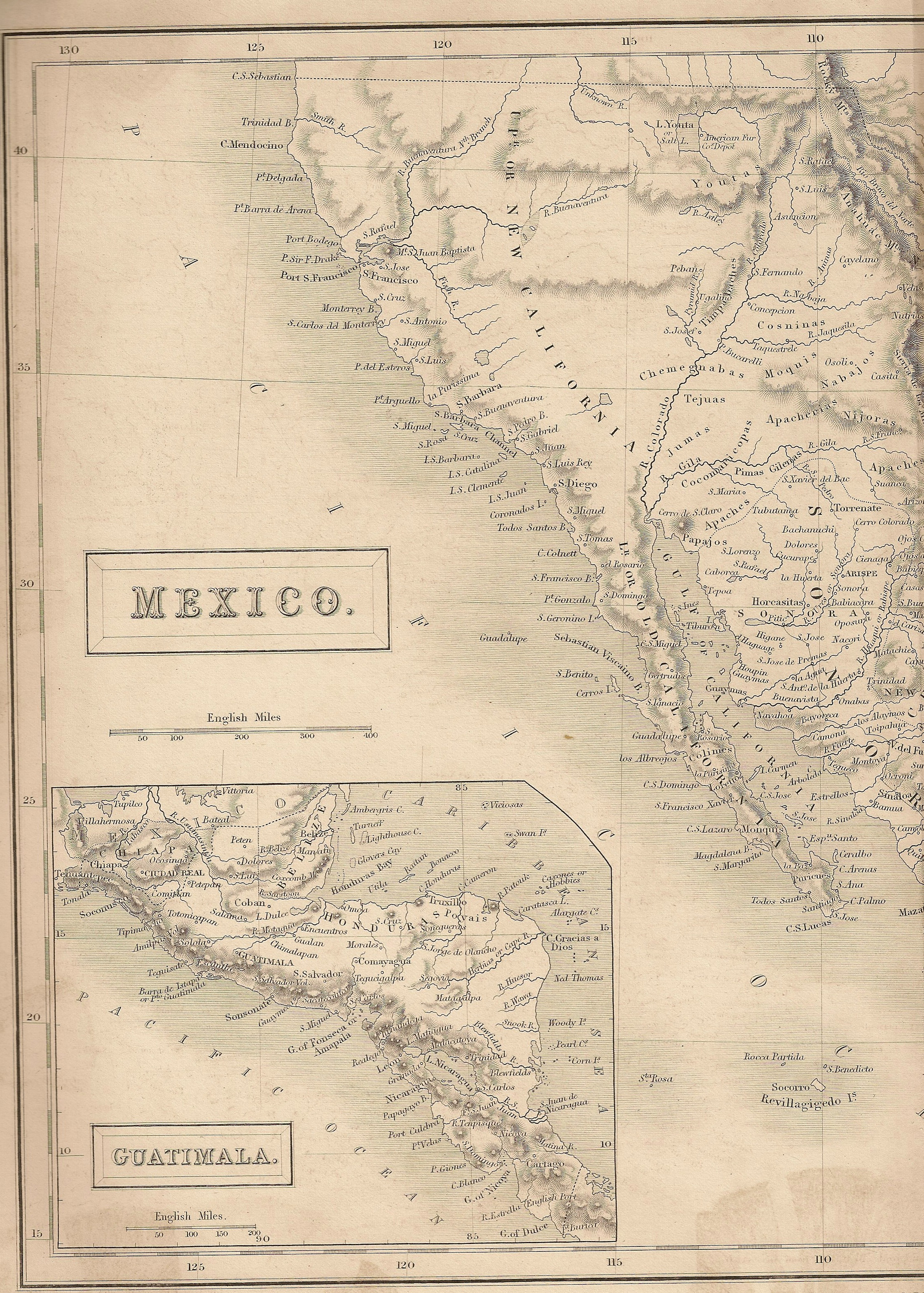
Map showing Utah in 1838 when it was part of Mexico. From Britannica 7th edition.

All of what is now Utah was claimed by the Spanish Empire from the 1500s to 1821 as part of New Spain (later as the province Alta California). It was subsequently claimed by Mexico from 1821 to 1848. However, Spain and Mexico had little permanent presence in, or control of, the region. Modern Utah nonetheless has many Spanish-language place names (e.g., San Juan County and Sanpete County; and the cities of Escalante, Salina, Santa Clara or La Verkin).

Beginning in 1540, Spanish explorers such as Francisco Vázquez de Coronado began venturing north into Arizona, New Mexico, and possibly Utah searched for gold and the legendary wealthy settlement of Cibola. Over the next 250 years, regular Spanish explorations into what is today Utah led to the establishment of the Old Spanish Trail by the 1800s as a major thoroughfare in the American Southwest.

An expedition led by two Spanish Catholic priests, called the Domínguez–Escalante expedition, left Santa Fe in 1776, hoping to find a route to the California coast. The expedition traveled as far north as Utah Lake and encountered the native residents.

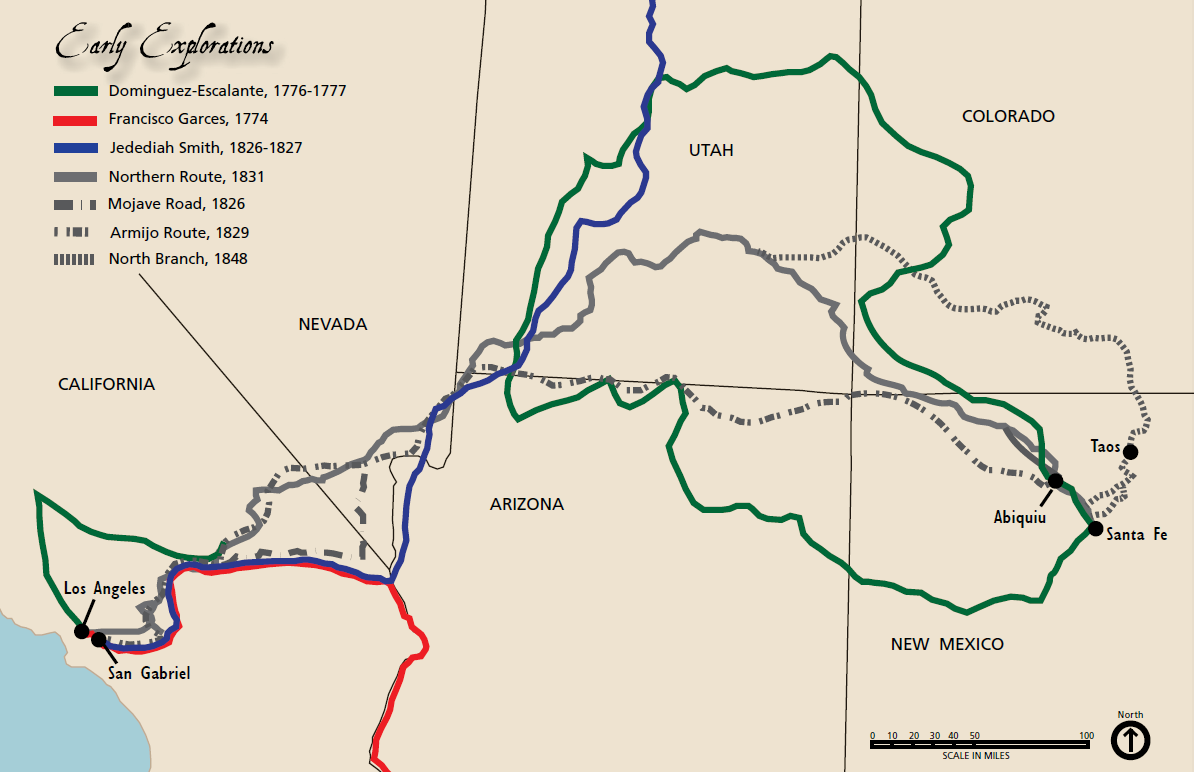
Early explorations along the Old Spanish Trail

Fur trappers (also known as mountain men) including Jim Bridger, explored some regions of Utah in the early 19th century. The city of Provo was named for one such man, Étienne Provost, who visited the area in 1825. The city of Ogden, Utah is named for a brigade leader of the Hudson's Bay Company, Peter Skene Ogden who trapped in the Weber Valley. In 1846, a year before the arrival of members from the Church of Jesus Christ of latter-day Saints, the ill-fated Donner Party crossed through the Salt Lake valley late in the season, deciding not to stay the winter there but to continue forward to California, and beyond.

== Mormon colonization ==
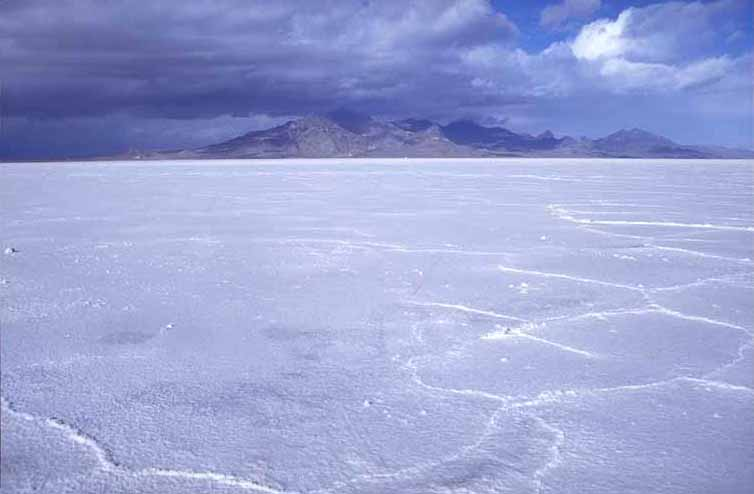
Bonneville Salt Flats

Emigrant members of the Church of Jesus Christ of Latter-day Saints, commonly known as Mormon pioneers, (and today as the Mormons) were encouraged in their choice to settle in the Great Basin and the Great Basin Desert by the favorable descriptions of the Great Salt Lake and surrounding Salt Lake Valley that had been written by Western explorer, surveyor / mapmaker and United States Army officer John C. Frémont. (1813-1899), Brigham Young and an accompanying group of pioneers traveling westward across the Great Plains from Missouri. and Illinois and first centered the Salt Lake Valley on July 24, 1847. At the time, the U.S. military with simultaneous Army expedition from the east into Santa Fe, the longtime provincial capital of Royal Spanish colony, then later independent Centralist Republic of Mexico's major town of New Mexico. The American army column moved later further west into California plus a naval squadron from the west anchored offshore in the Pacific Ocean to invade California. So quickly did the U.S. already captured the northwestern Mexican provinces of Alta California (Upper California) and New Mexico in this brief Mexican–American War of 1846-1848, and planned to keep them. Further south separate joint American army and naval units invaded Mexico from the east on the Gulf of Mexico coast marching inland and after some spirited battles, occupied their capital of Mexico City upon their later surrender. New territories, including the future Territory and later State of Utah, officially became United States territory in the Mexican Cession (of the northwestern one-third of their country) on the peace negotiations and signing of the Treaty of Guadalupe Hidalgo, February 2, 1848, which was subsequently ratified by the United States Senate a month later on March 10, 1848.

Upon arrival in the Salt Lake Valley, the Mormon pioneers led by Young found no permanent settlement of Indians. Other areas along the Wasatch Range of mountains were occupied at the time of settlement by the Northwestern Shoshone and adjacent areas by other bands of Shoshone such as the Gosiute. The Northwestern Shoshone lived in the valleys on the eastern shore of Great Salt Lake and in adjacent mountain valleys. Some years after arriving in the Salt Lake Valley Mormons, who went on to colonize many other areas of what is now Utah, were petitioned by Indians for recompense for land taken and occupied. The response of Heber C. Kimball, first counselor to Brigham Young, was that the land belonged to "our Father in Heaven and we expect to plow and plant it." A 1945 United States Supreme Court decision found that the land had been treated by the United States as public domain; no aboriginal title by the Northwestern Shoshone had been recognized by the United States or extinguished by treaty with the United States.

=== Colonizing the desert ===
Upon arriving in the Salt Lake Valley, the Mormons had to make a place to live. They created irrigation systems, for the dry desert lands, laid out farms, built houses, churches, and schools within just a few years. The grid-like layout of these communities, which prioritized communal labor and a centralized spiritual center, remain across Utah as part of what is regarded as the Mormon cultural landscape. Access to water was crucially important. Almost immediately, Brigham Young set out to identify and claim additional community sites. While it was difficult to find large areas in the Great Basin where water sources were dependable and growing seasons long enough to raise vitally important subsistence crops, satellite communities began to be formed.

Shortly after the first company arrived in the Salt Lake Valley in 1847, the community of Bountiful was settled further to the north. In 1848, settlers moved into lands purchased from trapper Miles Goodyear in present-day Ogden. In 1849, towns of Tooele and Provo were founded. Also that year, at the invitation of Ute chief Wakara, settlers moved into the Sanpete Valley in central Utah to establish the community of Manti. Fillmore, Utah, intended to be the capital of the new territory, was established in 1851. In 1855, missionary efforts aimed at western native cultures led to outposts in Fort Lemhi, Idaho, Las Vegas (in future Nevada), and the Elk Mountain in east-central Utah.

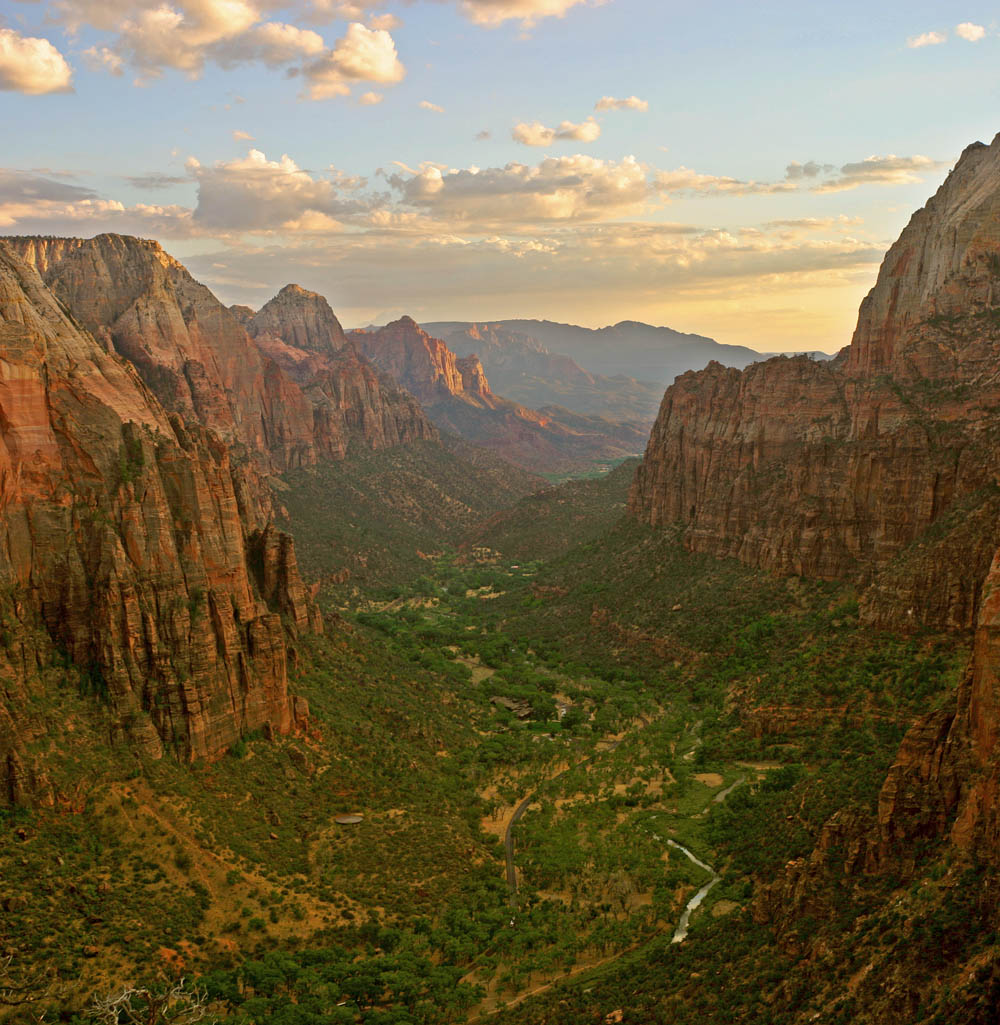
Zion National Park

The experiences of returning members of the Mormon Battalion were also important in establishing new communities. On their journey west, the Mormon soldiers had identified dependable rivers and fertile river valleys in Colorado, Arizona and southern California. In addition, as the men traveled to rejoin their families in the Salt Lake Valley, they moved through southern Nevada and the eastern segments of southern Utah. Jefferson Hunt, a senior Mormon officer of the Battalion, actively searched for settlement sites, minerals, and other resources. His report encouraged 1851 settlement efforts in Iron County, near present-day Cedar City. These southern explorations eventually led to extended Mormon settlements in St. George, Utah, Las Vegas, Nevada, and San Bernardino, California, as well as communities in southern Arizona Territory

== Territorial period ==
After the 1848 Treaty of Guadalupe Hidalgo deeded Mexican territory to the United States, Latter-day Saint colonizers scrambled to form what they called the State of Deseret. The proposed state encompassed much of what is now Utah, and portions of Colorado, Idaho, Nevada, Wyoming, Arizona, Oregon, New Mexico and California. The name of Deseret was favored by the Latter-day Saint leader Brigham Young as a symbol of industry and was derived from a reference in the Book of Mormon. The petition was rejected by Congress and Utah did not become a state until 1896, following the Utah Constitutional Convention of 1895. In the meantime, the Utah Territory was created with the Compromise of 1850, and Fillmore (named after President Fillmore) was designated the capital. In 1856, Salt Lake City replaced Fillmore as the territorial capital. The forty-six year territorial period of Utah was characterized by economic and agricultural development as well as conflict between Latter-day Saint settlers and those from the outside.

=== Displacement of Native Americans ===
Prior to establishment of the Oregon and California trails and Mormon settlement, Indians native to the Salt Lake Valley and adjacent areas lived by hunting buffalo and other game, but also gathered grass seed from the bountiful grass of the area as well as roots such as those of the Indian Camas. By the time of settlement, indeed before 1840, the buffalo were gone from the valley, but hunting by settlers and grazing of cattle severely impacted the Indians in the area, and as settlement expanded into nearby river valleys and oases, indigenous tribes experienced increasing difficulty in gathering sufficient food. Brigham Young's counsel was to feed the hungry tribes, and that was done, but it was often not enough. These tensions formed the background to the Bear River massacre committed by California Militia stationed in Salt Lake City during the Civil War. The site of the massacre is just inside Preston, Idaho, but was generally thought to be within Utah at the time.

The boundaries of the provisional State of Deseret—as proposed in 1849—are shown with a dotted line. The Utah Territory as organized in 1850, is shown in blue with black outline.

=== Slavery ===
The first group of pioneers brought African slaves with them, making Utah the only place in the western United States to have African slavery. Three slaves, Green Flake, Hark Lay, and Oscar Crosby, came west with this first group in 1847. The settlers also began to purchase Indian slaves in the well-established Indian slave trade, as well as enslaving Indian prisoners of war. In 1850, 26 slaves were counted in Salt Lake County. Slavery didn't become officially recognized until 1852, when the Act in Relation to Service and the Act for the relief of Indian Slaves and Prisoners were passed. Slavery was repealed on June 19, 1862, when Congress prohibited slavery in all US territories.

=== Utah War ===
Disputes between the Mormon inhabitants and the federal government intensified after the Church of Jesus Christ of Latter-day Saints' practice of polygamy became known. The polygamous practices of the Mormons, which were made public in 1854, would be one of the major reasons Utah was denied statehood until almost 50 years after the Mormons had entered the area.

After news of their polygamous practices spread, the members of the LDS Church were quickly viewed by some as un-American and rebellious. In 1857, after news of a possible rebellion spread, President James Buchanan sent troops on the Utah expedition to quell the growing unrest and to replace Brigham Young as territorial governor with Alfred Cumming. The expedition was also known as the Utah War.

As fear of invasion grew, Mormon settlers had convinced some Paiute Indians to aid in a Mormon-led attack on 120 immigrants from Arkansas under the guise of Indian aggression. The murder of these settlers became known as the Mountain Meadows massacre. The Mormon leadership had adopted a defensive posture that led to a ban on the selling of grain to outsiders in preparation for an impending war. This chafed pioneers traveling through the region, who were unable to purchase badly needed supplies. A disagreement between some of the Arkansas pioneers and the Mormons in Cedar City led to the secret planning of the massacre by a few Mormon leaders in the area. Some scholars debate the involvement of Brigham Young. Only one man, John D. Lee, was ever convicted of the murders, and he was executed at the massacre site.

Express riders had brought the news 1,000 miles from the Missouri River settlements to Salt Lake City within about two weeks of the army's beginning to march west. Fearing the worst as 2,500 troops (roughly 1/3rd of the army then) led by General Albert Sidney Johnston started west, Brigham Young ordered all residents of Salt Lake City and neighboring communities to prepare their homes for burning and evacuate southward to Utah Valley and southern Utah. Young also sent out a few units of the Nauvoo Legion (numbering roughly 8,000–10,000), to delay the army's advance. The majority he sent into the mountains to prepare defenses or south to prepare for a scorched earth retreat. Although some army wagon supply trains were captured and burned and herds of army horses and cattle run off no serious fighting occurred. Starting late and short on supplies, the United States Army camped during the bitter winter of 1857–58 near a burned out Fort Bridger in Wyoming. Through the negotiations between emissary Thomas L. Kane, Young, Cumming and Johnston, control of Utah territory was peacefully transferred to Cumming, who entered an eerily vacant Salt Lake City in the spring of 1858. By agreement with Young, Johnston established the army at Fort Floyd 40 miles away from Salt Lake City, to the southwest.

=== Transcontinental telegraph ===
Salt Lake City was the last link of the First Transcontinental Telegraph, between Carson City, Nevada and Omaha, Nebraska completed in October 1861. Brigham Young, who had helped expedite construction, was among the first to send a message, along with Abraham Lincoln and other officials. Soon after the telegraph line was completed, the Deseret Telegraph Company built the Deseret line connecting the settlements in the territory with Salt Lake City and, by extension, the rest of the United States.

=== Civil War ===
Because of the American Civil War, federal troops were pulled out of Utah Territory (and their fort auctioned off), leaving the territorial government in federal hands without army backing until General Patrick E. Connor arrived with the 3rd Regiment of California Volunteers in 1862. While in Utah, Connor and his troops soon became discontent with this assignment wanting to head to Virginia where the "real" fighting and glory was occurring. Connor established Fort Douglas just three miles (5 km) east of Salt Lake City and encouraged his bored and often idle soldiers to go out and explore for mineral deposits to bring more non-Mormons into the state. Minerals were discovered in Tooele County, and some miners began to come to the territory. Conner also solved the Shoshone Indian problem in Cache Valley Utah by luring the Shoshone into a midwinter confrontation on January 29, 1863. The armed conflict quickly turned into a rout, discipline among the soldiers broke down, and the Battle of Bear River is today usually referred to by historians as the Bear River Massacre. Between 200 and 400 Shoshone men, women and children were killed, as were 27 soldiers, with over 50 more soldiers wounded or suffering from frostbite.

Beginning in 1865, Utah's Black Hawk War developed into the deadliest conflict in the territory's history. Chief Antonga Black Hawk died in 1870, but fights continued to break out until additional federal troops were sent in to suppress the Ghost Dance of 1872. The war is unique among Indian Wars because it was a three-way conflict, with mounted Timpanogos Utes led by Antonga Black Hawk fighting federal and Utah local militia.

On May 10, 1869, the First transcontinental railroad was completed at Promontory Summit, north of the Great Salt Lake. The railroad brought increasing numbers of people into the state, and several influential businessmen made fortunes in the territory.

=== Polygamy ===
During the 1870s and 1880s, federal laws were passed and federal marshals assigned to enforce the laws against polygamy. In the 1890 Manifesto, the LDS Church leadership dropped its approval of polygamy citing divine revelation. When Utah applied for statehood again in 1895, it was accepted. Statehood was officially granted on January 4, 1896.

=== Women's suffrage ===
The Mormon issue made the situation for women the topic of nationwide controversy. In February 1870 the territorial legislature, controlled by Mormons, extended the right to vote to women citizens in Utah Territory. Although Wyoming Territory had passed women's suffrage two months previously, the timing of elections meant that Utah women were the first in the United States to cast ballots under an equal suffrage law, first in municipal elections that spring and later in the general election in August. However, in 1887, Congress disenfranchised Utah women with the Edmunds–Tucker Act. In 1867–96, eastern activists promoted women's suffrage in Utah as an experiment, and as a way to eliminate polygamy. They were Presbyterians and other Protestants convinced that Mormonism was a non-Christian cult that grossly mistreated women. The Mormons promoted woman suffrage to counter the negative image of downtrodden Mormon women. With the 1890 Manifesto clearing the way for statehood, in 1895 Utah adopted a constitution restoring the right of women's suffrage. Congress admitted Utah as a state with that constitution in 1896.

=== Vigilante violence ===
Though less numerous than other intermountain states at the time, several lynching murders for alleged misdeeds occurred in Utah territory at the hand of vigilantes. Those documented include the following, with their ethnicity or national origin noted in parentheses if it was provided in the source:

- William Torrington in Carson City (then a part of Utah territory), 1859
- Thomas Coleman (Black man) in Salt Lake City, 1866
- 3 unidentified men at Wahsatch, winter of 1868
- A Black man in Uintah, 1869
- Charles A. Benson in Logan, 1873
- Ah Sing (Chinese man) in Corinne, 1874
- Thomas Forrest in St. George, 1880
- William Harvey (Black man) in Salt Lake City, 1883
- John Murphy in Park City, 1883
- George Segal (Japanese man) in Ogden, 1884
- Joseph Fisher in Eureka, 1886
- Robert Marshall (Black man) in Castle Gate, 1925

Other lynchings in Utah territory include multiple instances of mass murder of Native American children, women, and men by White settlers including the Battle Creek massacre (1849), Provo River Massacre (1850), Nephi massacre (1853), and Circleville Massacre (1866).

== 20th and 21st century ==
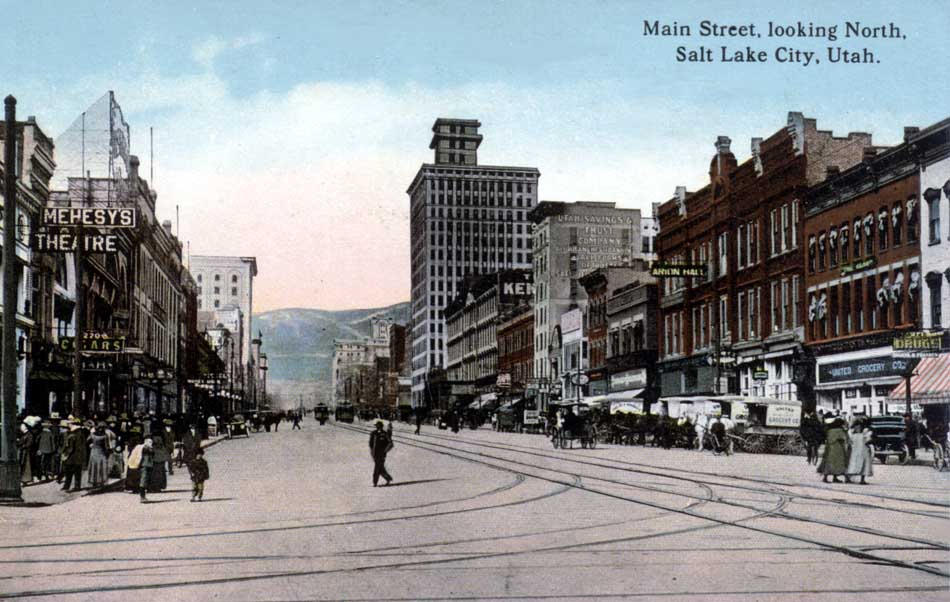
Downtown Salt Lake City in the early 20th century.

Beginning in the early 20th century, with the establishment of such national parks as Bryce Canyon National Park and Zion National Park, Utah began to become known for its natural beauty. Southern Utah became a popular filming spot for arid, rugged scenes, and such natural landmarks as Delicate Arch and "the Mittens" of Monument Valley are instantly recognizable to most national residents. During the 1950s, 1960s, and 1970s, with the construction of the Interstate highway system, accessibility to the southern scenic areas was made easier.

Beginning in 1939, with the establishment of Alta Ski Area, Utah has become world-renowned for its skiing. The dry, powdery snow of the Wasatch Range is considered some of the best skiing in the world. Salt Lake City won the bid for the 2002 Winter Olympics in 1995, and this has served as a great boost to the economy. The ski resorts have increased in popularity, and many of the Olympic venues scattered across the Wasatch Front continue to be used for sporting events. This also spurred the development of the light-rail system in the Salt Lake Valley, known as TRAX, and the re-construction of the freeway system around the city. The state will again host the games in 2034.

During the late 20th century, the state grew quickly. In the 1970s, growth was phenomenal in the suburbs. Sandy was one of the fastest-growing cities in the country at that time, and West Valley City is the state's 2nd most populous city. Today, many areas of Utah are seeing phenomenal growth. Northern Davis, southern and western Salt Lake, Summit, eastern Tooele, Utah, Wasatch, and Washington counties are all growing very quickly. Transportation and urbanization are major issues in politics as development consumes agricultural land and wilderness areas.

The State of Utah passed the Utah Transfer of Public Lands Act in 2012 in an attempt to gain control over a substantial portion of federal land in the state from the federal government, based on language in the Utah Enabling Act of 1894. The State does not intend to use force or assert control by limiting access in an attempt to control the disputed lands, but does intend to use a multi-step process of education, negotiation, legislation, and if necessary, litigation as part of its multi-year effort to gain state or private control over the lands after 2014.

During a debate at Utah Valley University on September 10, 2025, conservative political activist Charlie Kirk was assassinated.

== World War II ==
Utah families, like most Americans everywhere, did their utmost to assist in the war effort. Tires, meat, butter, sugar, fats, oils, coffee, shoes, boots, gasoline, canned fruits, vegetables, and soups were rationed on a national basis. The school day was shortened and bus routes were reduced to limit the number of resources used stateside and increase what could be sent to soldiers.

Geneva Steel was built to increase the steel production for America during World War II. President Franklin D. Roosevelt had proposed opening a steel mill in Utah in 1936, but the idea was shelved after a couple of months. After the attack on Pearl Harbor, the United States entered the war and the steel plant was put into progress. In April 1944, Geneva shipped its first order, which consisted of over 600 tons of steel plate. Geneva Steel also brought thousands of job opportunities to Utah. The positions were hard to fill as many of Utah's men were overseas fighting. Women began working, filling 25 percent of the jobs.

As a result of Utah's and Geneva Steels contribution during the war, several Liberty Ships were named in honor of Utah including the USS Joseph Smith, USS Brigham Young, USS Provo, and the USS Peter Skene Ogden.

One of the sectors of the beachhead of Normandy Landings was codenamed Utah Beach, and the amphibious landings at the beach were undertaken by United States Army troops.

It is estimated that 1,450 soldiers from Utah were killed in the war.

== See also ==
- History of African Americans in Utah
- History of the Colorado Plateau
- History of the Rocky Mountains
- History of the Western United States
- Territorial evolution of Utah
