= Three Cedars Solar Project =

Solar power station in Iron County, Utah, United States

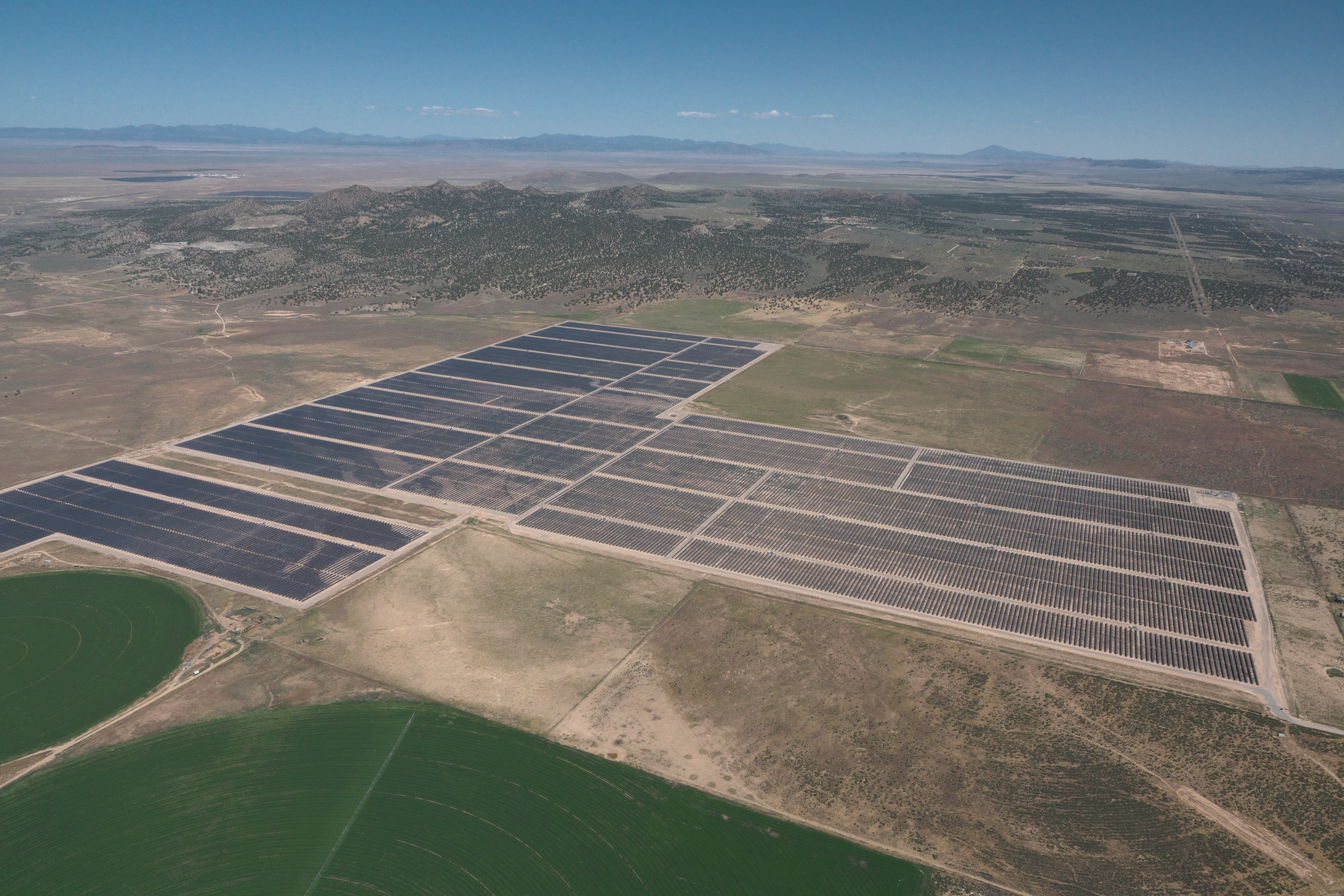
- Iron Springs Unit
- Country: United States
- Location: Iron County
- Coordinates: 37°43′16″N 113°09′06″W
- Status: Operational
- Construction began: September 2015
- Commission date: September 2016
- Construction cost: $400 million
- Owner: Dominion Renewable Energy
- Operator: Swinerton Renewable Energy

Solar farm
- Type: Flat-panel PV single-axis tracking
- Site area: 1,600 acres (6.47 km^{2})

Power generation
- Nameplate capacity: 265 MW_{p}, 210 MW_{AC}
- Capacity factor: 29.5% (average 2017-2019)
- Annual net output: 543 GW·h, 340 MW·h/acre

External links
- Commons: Related media on Commons

Three Cedars Solar Project is a 210 MW_{AC} (265 MW_{p}) photovoltaic power station consisting of three units extending about 15 miles northwest of Cedar City, Utah. The project was developed by SunEdison, built with its global team of partners, and commissioned in September 2016. The electricity and renewable energy credits are being sold to Rocky Mountain Power under three separate 20-year power purchase agreements.

== Project details ==
The project consists of three separate units distributed on private land along the headwaters of Iron Springs Creek at a sunny and cool elevation near 6,000 feet.

Three Cedars Solar Project
Unit	Capacity MW_{AC}	Complete Date	Coordinates	Site Area (approx)
Iron Springs	80 MW	July 2016	37°43′16″N 113°09′06″W	600 acres
Granite Mountain East	80 MW	October 2016	37°46′30″N 113°13′35″W	600 acres
Granite Mountain West	50.4 MW	October 2016	37°47′08″N 113°16′43″W	400 acres

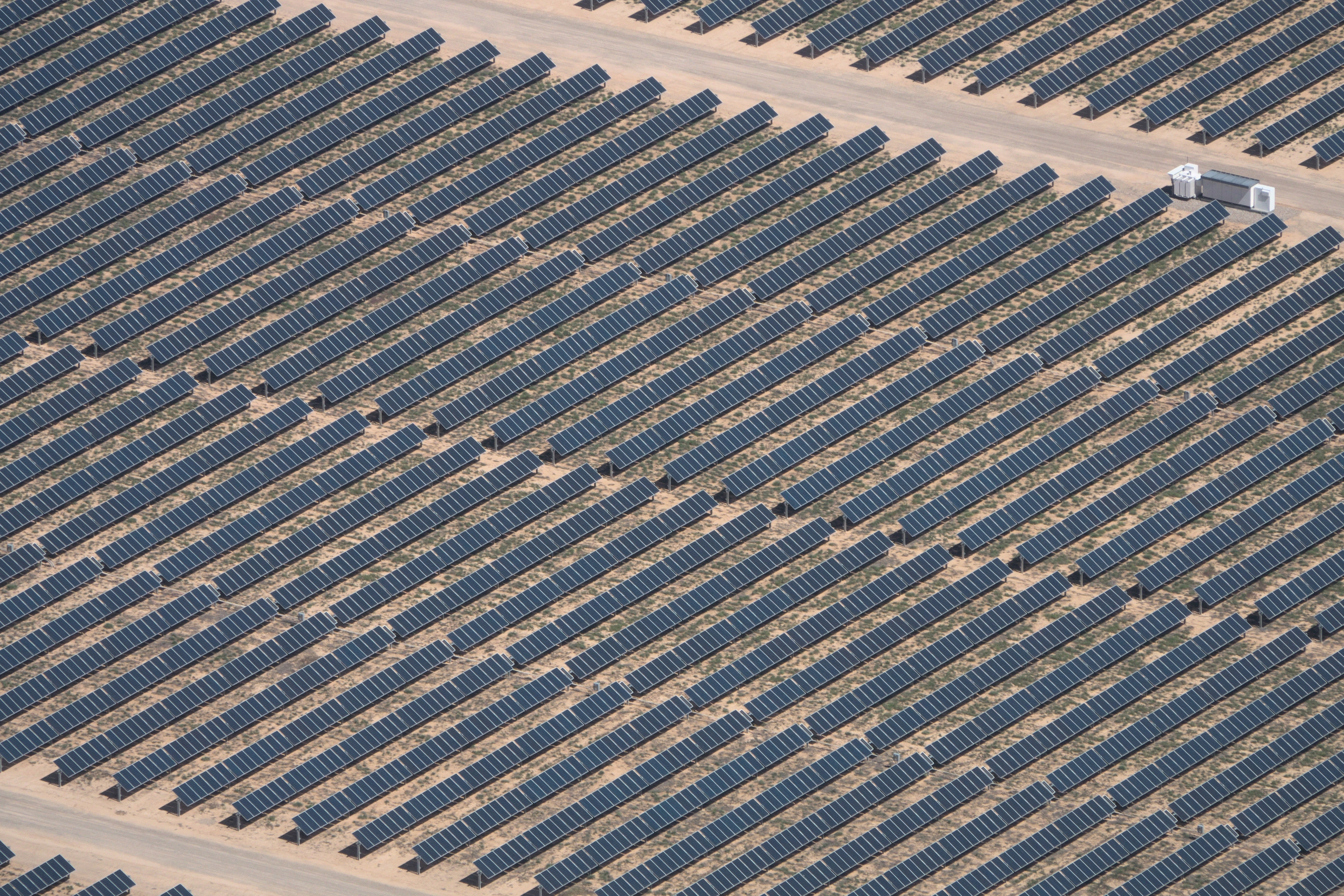
Three Cedars Solar Project, Iron Springs Unit

Planning was initiated by the independent renewable energy developer First Wind (founded 2002) which began expanding into photovoltaic energy around 2012. First Wind and its extensive portfolio of assets in western Utah were acquired by SunEdison and its TerraForm Power yield co in November 2014. Beginning construction at the time was the 20.2 MW Seven Sisters Project, a dispersed set of ~3 MW facilities throughout Beaver and Iron counties.

To finance the construction of Three Cedars, SunEdison entered into a joint venture with Dominion Resources. The resulting entity, Dominion Renewable Energy, utilized $80 million from SunEdison and $320 million from Dominion to start construction in September 2015. The two companies also previously entered a joint venture to construct the 320 MW Four Brothers Project, which includes the three co-located 80 MW Escalante units in Beaver County and the 80 MW Enterprise unit in Iron County, on about the same timeline.

Construction of Three Cedars progressed simultaneously at all three sites, created an estimated 250 local construction jobs, and was completed by October 2016. Along with the electricity to power more than 36,000 homes, it is expected to produce $17 million in property and income taxes for the region over 20 years. The project is operated and maintained by Swinerton Renewable Energy.

SunEdison filed for Chapter 11 bankruptcy protection on April 21, 2016, but was able to complete the project on time with its receipt of $300 million in bankruptcy debt financing. On September 13, 2016, the company was forced to sell its stake in the completed facilities in a fire sale. NRG Energy was the successful bidder.

== Electricity production ==
Total Facility Generation (Annual Sum from All Units Below)
Year	Total Annual MW·h
2016	196,000
2017	548,663
2018	543,454
2019	537,739
Average (2017–2019)	543,285

Generation (MW·h) of Iron Springs Solar - (80 MW unit)
Year	Jan	Feb	Mar	Apr	May	Jun	Jul	Aug	Sep	Oct	Nov	Dec	Total
2016						15,990	22,101	20,386	19,179	15,630	12,391	8,799	114,476
2017	8,564	12,655	18,952	20,815	24,809	27,123	20,208	19,367	17,312	18,209	12,527	11,465	212,005
2018	10,987	12,921	16,708	20,249	23,334	25,076	21,857	21,822	20,974	15,640	12,892	9,334	211,796
2019	10,829	11,411	16,999	20,012	21,305	23,964	22,683	23,091	19,061	18,736	11,645	8,488	208,224
Average Annual Production (years 2017–2019) :													210,675

Generation (MW·h) of Granite Mountain Solar East - (80 MW unit)
Year	Jan	Feb	Mar	Apr	May	Jun	Jul	Aug	Sep	Oct	Nov	Dec	Total
2016								12,633	9,216	13,374	12,138	8,436	55,797
2017	8,430	12,457	18,656	20,489	24,421	26,699	19,891	19,064	17,041	17,924	12,331	11,285	208,687
2018	10,795	12,695	16,416	19,895	22,926	24,638	21,475	21,441	20,607	15,366	12,666	9,171	208,091
2019	10,614	11,184	16,660	19,613	20,881	23,487	22,231	22,631	18,681	18,363	11,413	8,319	204,075
Average Annual Production (years 2017–2019) :													206,951

Generation (MW·h) of Granite Mountain Solar West - (50.4 MW unit)
Year	Jan	Feb	Mar	Apr	May	Jun	Jul	Aug	Sep	Oct	Nov	Dec	Total
2016								3,176	6,217	3,441	7,452	5,441	25,727
2017	5,169	7,639	11,440	12,564	14,975	16,372	12,198	11,690	10,450	10,991	7,561	6,920	127,971
2018	6,410	7,538	9,748	11,814	13,614	14,630	12,752	12,732	12,237	9,125	7,522	5,446	123,567
2019	6,524	6,874	10,241	12,056	12,835	14,437	13,665	13,911	11,483	11,287	7,015	5,113	125,440
Average Annual Production (years 2017–2019) :													125,659

== See also ==
- Solar power in Utah
- List of power stations in Utah
