= Enterprise Solar Farm =

Solar power station in Utah, USA

- Country: United States
- Location: Iron County
- Coordinates: 37°38′28″N 113°36′45″W
- Status: Operational
- Construction began: July 2015
- Commission date: August 2016
- Construction cost: ~$163 million
- Owner: Dominion Renewable Energy
- Operator: Swinerton Renewable Energy

Solar farm
- Type: Flat-panel PV single-axis tracking
- Site area: 650 acres (2.63 km^{2})

Power generation
- Nameplate capacity: 105 MW_{p}, 80 MW_{AC}
- Capacity factor: 31.9% (average 2017-2019)
- Annual net output: 223 GW·h, 343 MW·h/acre

The Enterprise Solar Farm is an 80 MW_{AC} (105 MW_{p}) photovoltaic power station located about 25 miles west of Cedar City, Utah in Iron County. The project was developed by SunEdison, built by Mortenson Construction, and commissioned in September 2016. The electricity is being sold under a 20-year power purchase agreement to Rocky Mountain Power which serves customers in Utah, Idaho, and Wyoming.

== Project details ==
Planning was initiated by the independent renewable energy developer First Wind (founded 2002) which began expanding into photovoltaic energy around 2012. The Enterprise Solar Farm comprises a minority of the 320MW Four Brothers Project, which also includes the three co-located 80 MW Escalante Solar Project units located about 5 miles north of Milford, Utah in Beaver County. The land area for each 80 MW unit ranges from 600 to 700 acres.

First Wind and its extensive portfolio of assets in western Utah were acquired by SunEdison and its TerraForm Power yield co in November 2014. Beginning construction at the time was the 20.2 MW Seven Sisters Project, a dispersed set of ~3 MW facilities throughout Beaver and Iron counties. To finance construction of Four Brothers, SunEdison entered into a joint venture with Dominion Resources. The resulting entity, Dominion Renewable Energy, utilized $150 million from SunEdison and $500 million from Dominion to start construction in July 2015. Likewise, the two companies extended their joint venture to construct the 210 MW Three Cedars Project, which consists of three similarly sized facilities dispersed to the west of Cedar City, on about the same timeline.

Four Brothers was built by Mortenson Construction. SunEdison provided about 1.3 million crystalline silicon solar panels from its team of international suppliers. Work progressed simultaneously at all four sites, employed an estimated 500 workers, and was completed in September 2016. Along with the electricity to power about 90,000 homes, Four Brothers is expected to produce $66 million in property and income taxes for the region over 20 years. The completed facilities are operated and maintained by Swinerton Renewable Energy.

SunEdison filed for Chapter 11 bankruptcy protection on April 21, 2016, but was able to complete the project on time with its receipt of $300 million in bankruptcy debt financing. On September 13, 2016 the company was forced to sell its stake in the completed facilities in a fire sale. NRG Energy was the successful bidder.

== Electricity production ==
Generation (MW·h) of Enterprise Solar
| Year | Jan | Feb | Mar | Apr | May | Jun | Jul | Aug | Sep | Oct | Nov | Dec | Total |
|---|---|---|---|---|---|---|---|---|---|---|---|---|---|
| 2016 | | | | | 19,444 | 22,355 | 25,675 | 21,539 | 21,333 | 16,319 | 13,314 | 10,288 | 140,267 |
| 2017 | 9,059 | 13,387 | 20,048 | 22,019 | 26,244 | 28,692 | 21,376 | 20,487 | 18,313 | 19,262 | 13,251 | 12,128 | 224,267 |
| 2018 | 11,689 | 13,747 | 17,776 | 21,543 | 24,826 | 26,680 | 23,255 | 23,218 | 22,315 | 16,640 | 13,716 | 9,931 | 225,336 |
| 2019 | 11,444 | 12,059 | 17,964 | 21,148 | 22,515 | 25,325 | 23,971 | 24,402 | 20,143 | 19,800 | 12,306 | 8,970 | 220,046 |
| Average Annual Production (years 2017-2019) : | | | | | | | | | | | | | 223,216 |

== See also ==
- Solar power in Utah
- List of power stations in Utah
