= Escalante Solar Project =

Photovoltaic power station

- Country: United States
- Location: Beaver County
- Coordinates: 38°30′03″N 113°01′48″W
- Status: Operational
- Construction began: July 2015
- Commission date: August 2016
- Construction cost: ~$488 million
- Owner: Dominion Renewable Energy
- Operator: Swinerton Renewable Energy

Solar farm
- Type: Flat-panel PV single-axis tracking
- Site area: 1,900 acres (7.69 km^{2})

Power generation
- Nameplate capacity: 315 MW_{p}, 240 MW_{AC}
- Capacity factor: 29.4% (average 2017-2019)
- Annual net output: 619 GW·h, 326 MW·h/acre

The Escalante Solar Project is a 240 MW_{AC} (315 MW_{p}) photovoltaic power station located about 5 miles north of the town of Milford in Beaver County, Utah. The project was developed by SunEdison, built by Mortenson Construction, and commissioned in September 2016. The power is being sold under three separate 20-year power purchase agreements to Rocky Mountain Power which serves customers in Utah, Idaho, and Wyoming. At 1900 acres (3.0 sq miles), it is the largest grouping of photovoltaic generators in the state of Utah.

== Project details ==
The project is located adjacent to the 306 MW Milford Wind facility. Planning was initiated by the independent renewable energy developer First Wind (founded 2002) which began expanding into photovoltaic energy around 2012. The Escalante project comprises the majority of the 320 MW Four Brothers Project, which includes the three co-located 80 MW Escalante units and the 80 MW Enterprise unit located 25 miles west of Cedar City, Utah in Iron County. The land area for each unit ranges from 600 to 700 acres.

First Wind and its extensive portfolio of assets in western Utah were acquired by SunEdison and its TerraForm Power yield co in November 2014. Beginning construction at the time was the 20.2 MW Seven Sisters Project, a dispersed set of ~3 MW facilities throughout Beaver and Iron counties. To finance construction of Four Brothers, SunEdison entered into a joint venture with Dominion Resources. The resulting entity, Dominion Renewable Energy, utilized $150 million from SunEdison and $500 million from Dominion to start construction in July 2015. Likewise, the two companies extended their joint venture to construct the 210 MW Three Cedars Project, which consists of three similarly sized facilities dispersed to the west of Cedar City, on about the same timeline.

Four Brothers was built by Mortenson Construction. SunEdison provided about 1.3 million crystalline silicon solar panels from its team of international suppliers. Work progressed simultaneously at all four sites, employed an estimated 500 workers, and was completed in September 2016. Along with the electricity to power about 90,000 homes, Four Brothers is expected to produce $66 million in property and income taxes for the region over 20 years. The completed facilities are operated and maintained by Swinerton Renewable Energy.

SunEdison filed for Chapter 11 bankruptcy protection on April 21, 2016, but was able to complete the project on time with its receipt of $300 million in bankruptcy debt financing. On September 13, 2016 the company was forced to sell its stake in the completed facilities in a fire sale. NRG Energy was the successful bidder.

== Electricity production ==
Total Facility Generation (Annual Sum from All Units Below)
Year	Total Annual MW·h
2016	277,275
2017	624,023
2018	619,088
2019	613,269
Average (2017-2019)	618,793

Generation (MW·h) of Escalante Solar 1
Year	Jan	Feb	Mar	Apr	May	Jun	Jul	Aug	Sep	Oct	Nov	Dec	Total
2016							12,227	18,904	20,250	15,270	11,178	7,511	85,340
2017	8,355	12,346	18,489	20,306	24,202	26,460	19,714	18,894	16,888	17,764	12,220	11,184	206,822
2018	10,611	12,479	16,137	19,556	22,536	24,218	21,109	21,076	20,256	15,105	12,451	9,015	204,549
2019	10,669	11,242	16,748	19,716	20,990	23,610	22,348	22,750	18,779	18,459	11,473	8,362	205,146
Average Annual Production (years 2017-2019)													205,506

Generation (MW·h) of Escalante Solar 2
Year	Jan	Feb	Mar	Apr	May	Jun	Jul	Aug	Sep	Oct	Nov	Dec	Total
2016						2,584	18,384	20,475	20,169	14,354	11,002	7,467	94,435
2017	8,453	12,491	18,707	20,545	24,487	26,772	19,946	19,116	17,087	17,973	12,364	11,316	209,256
2018	10,790	12,690	16,409	19,886	22,916	24,627	21,466	21,432	20,598	15,360	12,661	9,167	208,002
2019	10,593	11,162	16,628	19,575	20,840	23,441	22,188	22,587	18,645	18,327	11,391	8,303	203,681
Average Annual Production (years 2017-2019)													206,980

Generation (MW·h) of Escalante Solar 3
Year	Jan	Feb	Mar	Apr	May	Jun	Jul	Aug	Sep	Oct	Nov	Dec	Total
2016						4,496	20,202	20,004	19,713	15,138	10,757	7,191	97,501
2017	8,400	12,413	18,589	20,416	24,334	26,604	19,821	18,996	16,980	17,860	12,287	11,245	207,945
2018	10,714	12,600	16,293	19,746	22,755	24,454	21,314	21,281	20,453	15,252	12,572	9,103	206,537
2019	10,633	11,204	16,690	19,648	20,918	23,529	22,271	22,672	18,715	18,396	11,433	8,334	204,442
Average Annual Production (years 2017-2019)													206,308

== See also ==
- Solar power in Utah
- List of power stations in Utah
