= List of power stations in Utah =

Sources of Utah utility-scale electricity generation in gigawatt-hours, full-year 2025:
1. Coal: 18,007 (48.1%)
2. Natural gas: 11,523 (30.8%)
3. Solar: 5,565 (14.9%)
4. Hydroelectric: 828 (2.21%)
5. Wind: 799 (2.13%)
6. Geothermal: 468 (1.25%)
7. Biomass: 61 (0.16%)
8. Petroleum: 31 (0.08%)
9. Other: 160 (0.43%)

This is a list of electricity-generating power stations in the U.S. state of Utah, sorted by type and name. In 2024, Utah had a total summer capacity of 10.3 GW through all of its power plants, and a net generation of 35,133 GWh. In 2025, the electrical energy generation mix was 48.1% coal, 30.8% natural gas, 14.9% solar, 2.2% hydroelectric, 2.1% wind, 1.3% geothermal, 0.2% biomass, 0.1% petroleum, and 0.4% other.

Small-scale solar including customer-owned photovoltaic panels delivered an additional net 1,105 GWh to Utah's electricity grid in 2025. This compares as less than one-fifth the amount generated by Utah's utility-scale PV plants. Coal previously generated 81% of Utah's electricity in 2013 and has been undergoing a gradual replacement with natural gas and renewables.

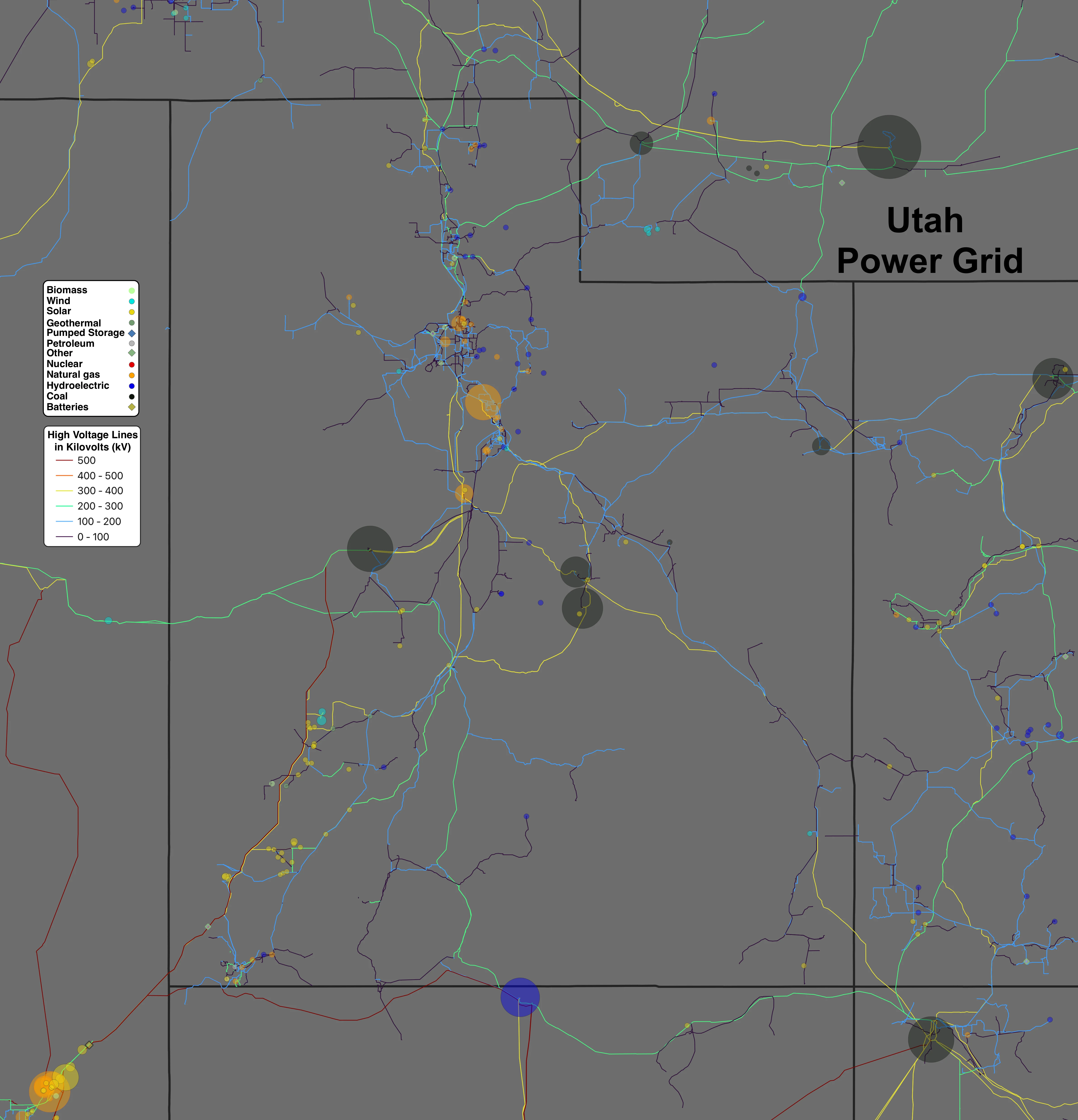
Utah power grid

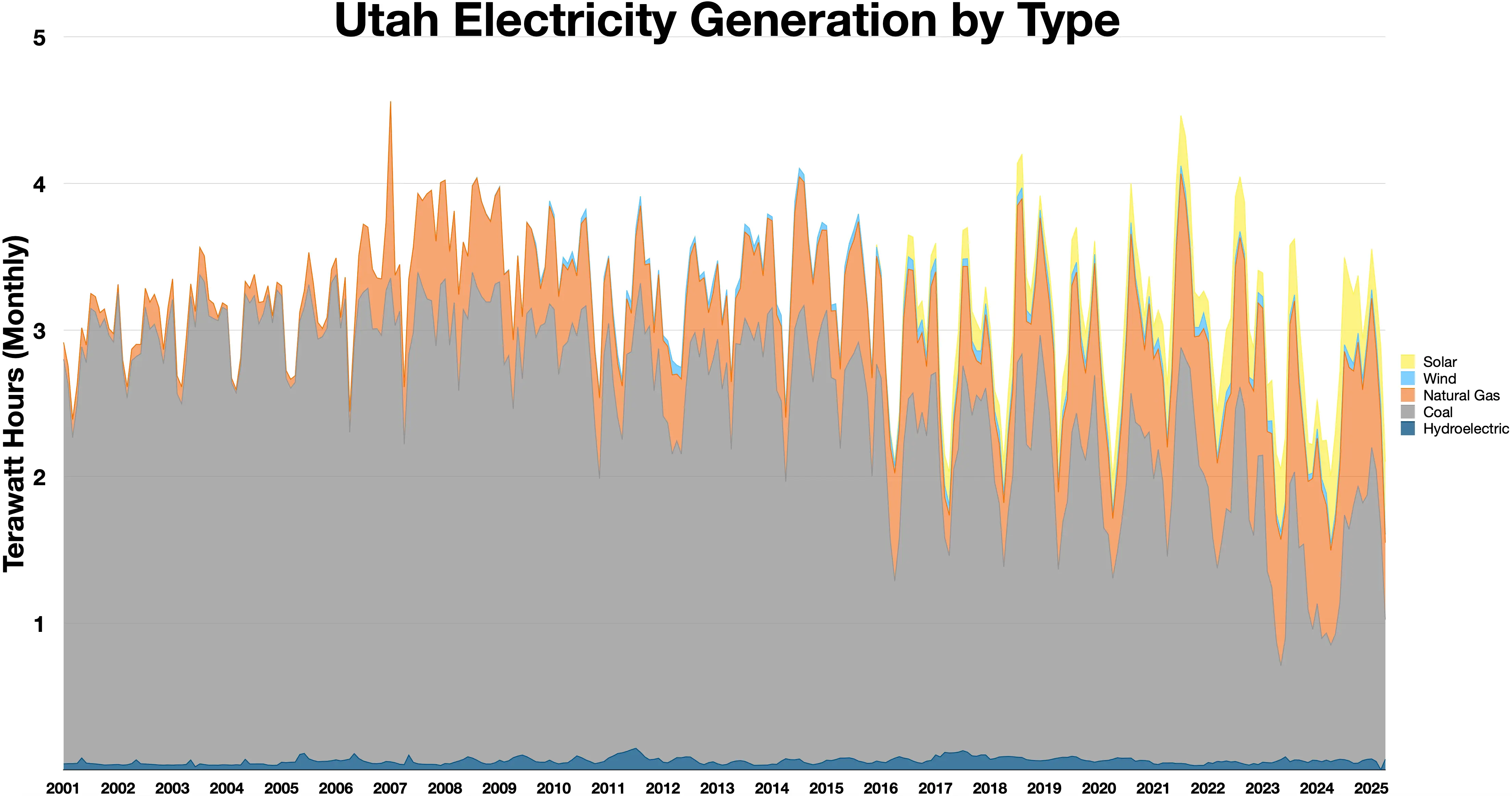
Utah electricity generation by type

== Natural-fuels power stations ==
Data from the U.S. Energy Information Administration serves as a general reference.

=== Coal-fired ===
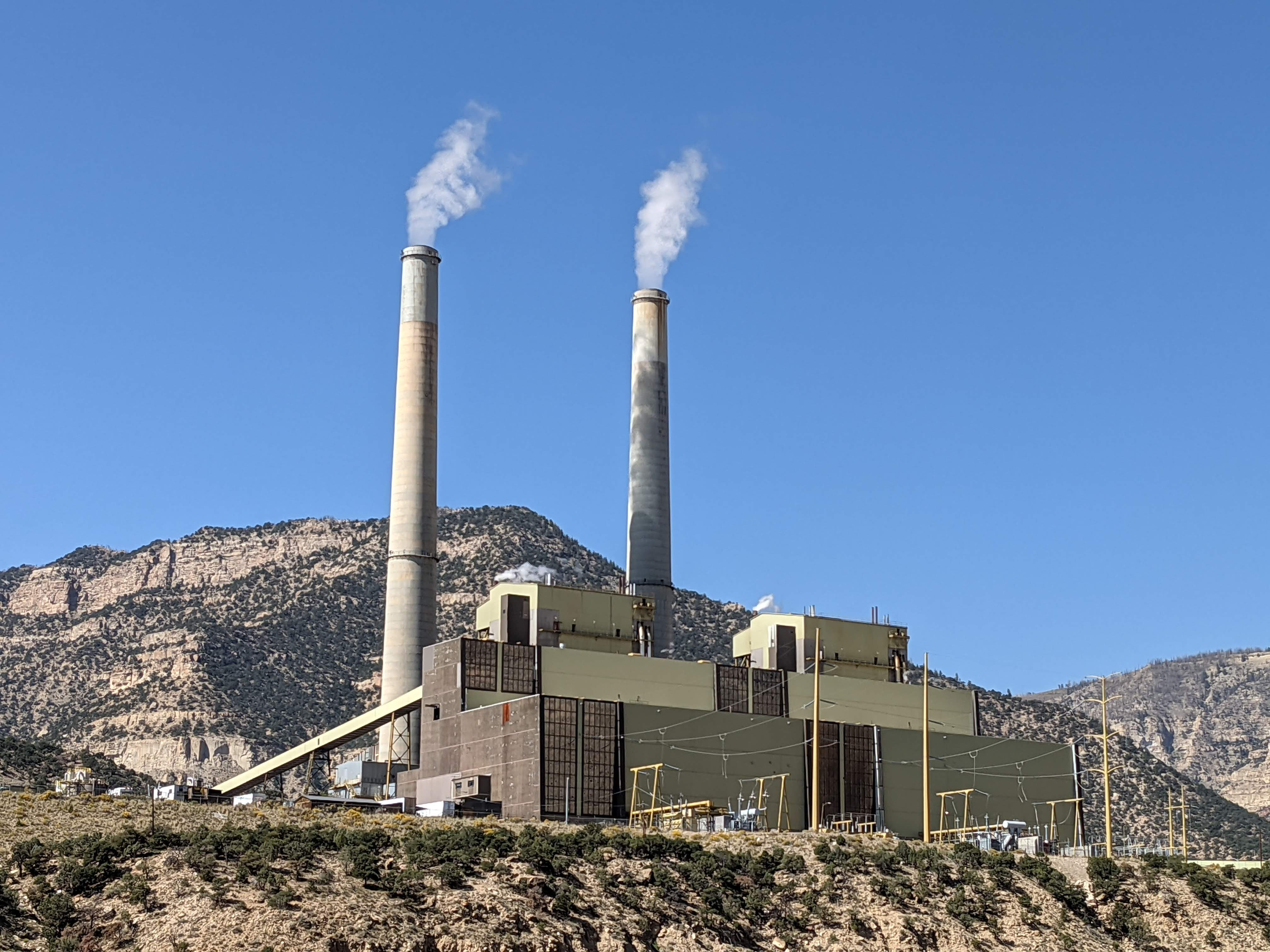
Pacificorp's Huntington Power Plant

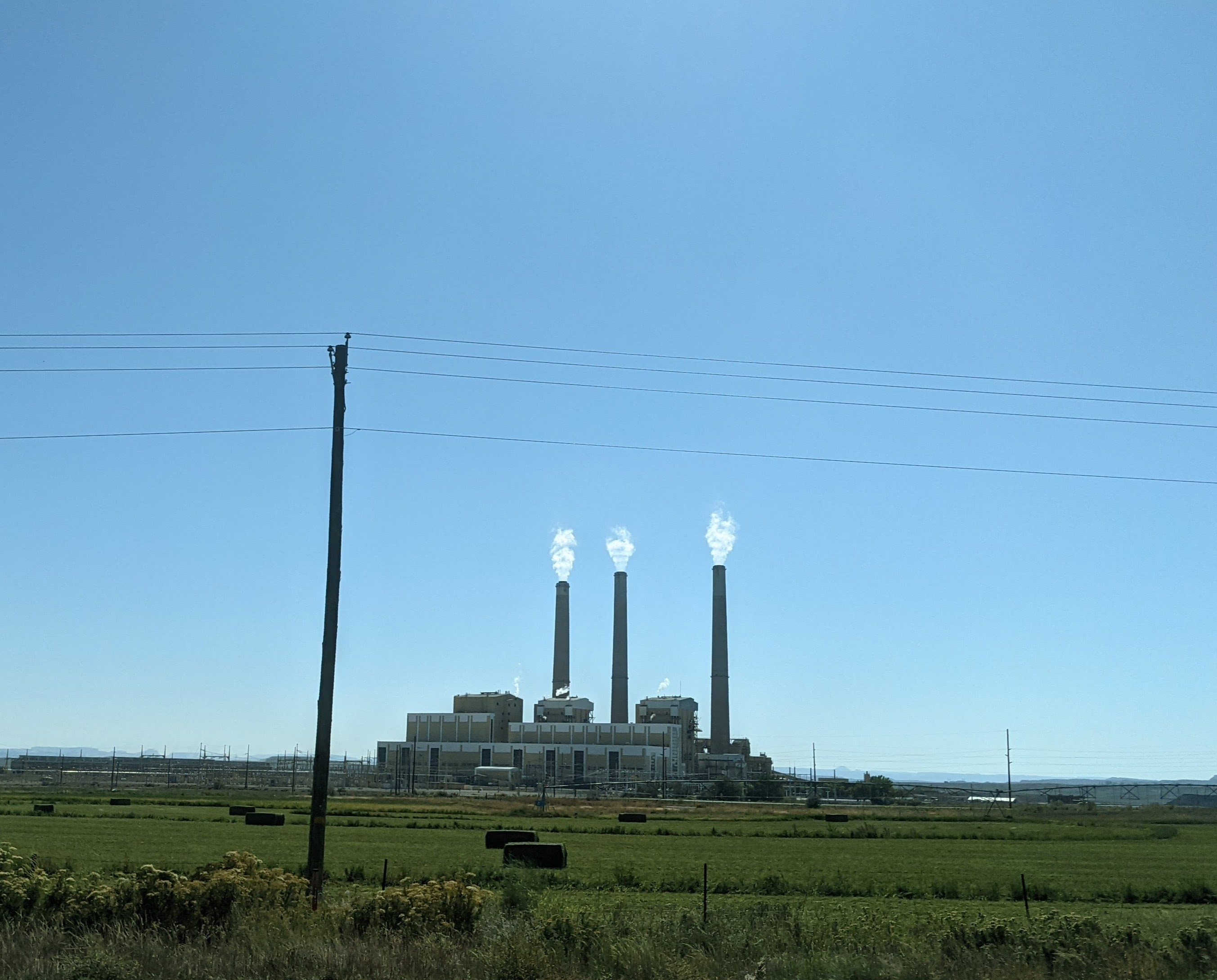
Pacificorp's Hunter Power Plant

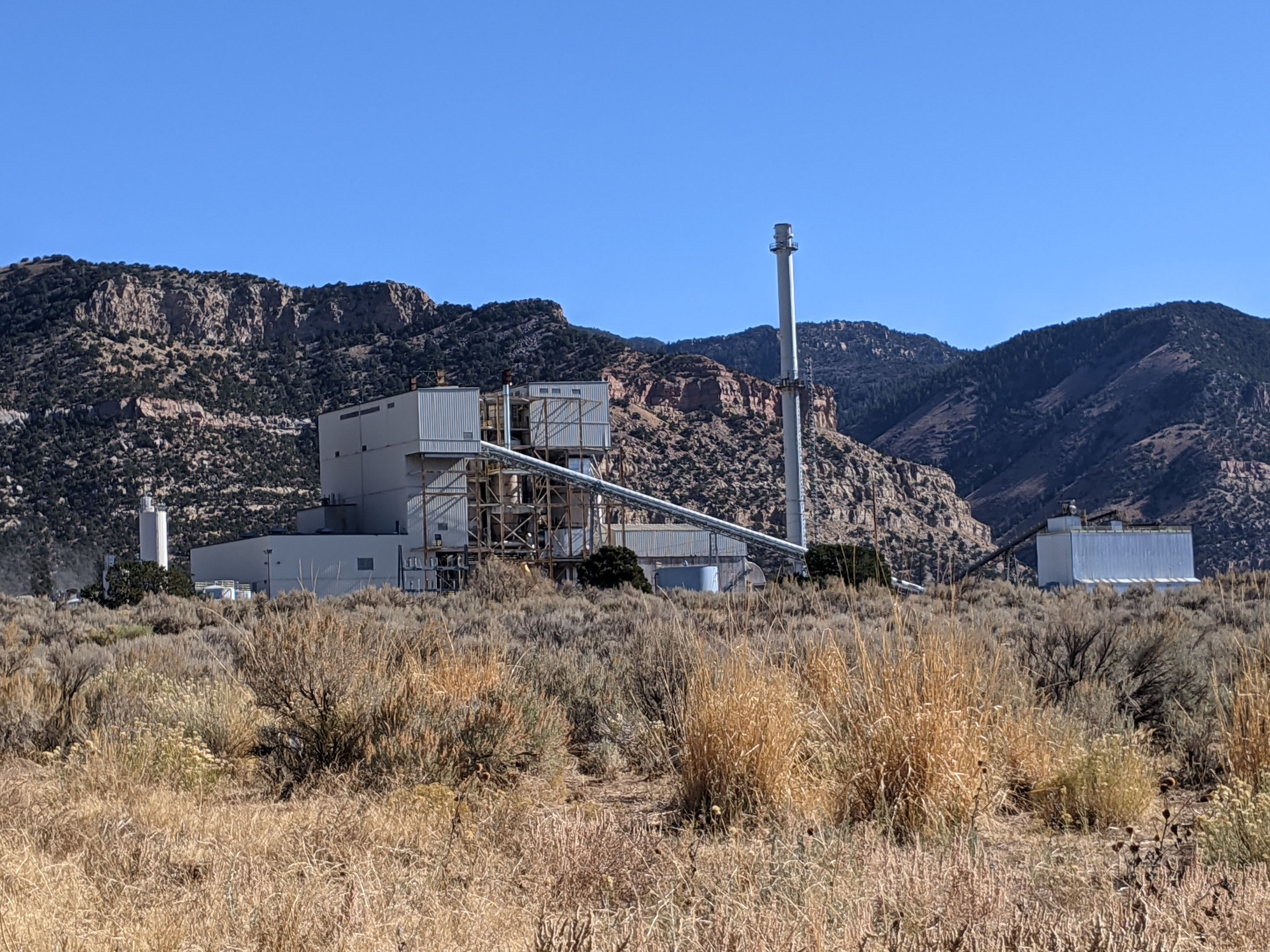
Colmac Sunnyside

Active power plants
Name	Operator	County	Coordinates	Capacity (MW)	Initially opened	Ref	Notes
Bonanza	Deseret Power	Uintah	40.0864°N 109.2844°W	500	1986		Scheduled to shut down in 2030.
Hunter	PacifiCorp	Emery	39.1747°N 111.0289°W	1,320	1978		Scheduled to shut down in 2032.
Huntington	PacifiCorp	Emery	39.3792°N 111.0781°W	1,073	1974		Scheduled to shut down in 2032.
Sunnyside	Colmac Sunnyside	Carbon	39.5472°N 110.3917°W	58	1993		

Decommissioned power plants
Name	Operator	County	Capacity (MW)	Initially opened	Closed	Ref
Carbon (Castle Gate)	PacifiCorp	Carbon	213	1954	2015	
Desert Power Plant	DQ Holdings	Magcorp, Tooele	43	1999	2008	
Hale Power Plant	Utah Power and Light Co.	Orem, Utah	44	1936	1990	
Intermountain (coal-fired units 1–2)	City of Los Angeles	Millard	1,640	1986	2025	
Kennecott (Units 1–3)	Kennecott Utah Copper	Salt Lake	100	1943	2016	
Kennecott (Unit 4)	Kennecott Utah Copper	Salt Lake	75	1960	2019	

=== Oil-fired ===
Name	Operator	County	Coordinates	Capacity (MW)	Generation type	Initially opened
Bloomington	St. George	Washington	37.0420°N 113.6267°W	10	Reciprocating engine (x6)	1999
Hurricane City Power	Hurricane	Washington	37.1856°N 113.2975°W	5	Reciprocating engine (x3)	1999/2001
St. George/Redrock	St. George	Washington	37.1137°N 113.5689°W	14	Reciprocating engine (x2)	1987

=== Natural gas-fired ===
Name	Operator	County	Coordinates	Capacity (MW)	Generation type	Initially opened	Ref	Note
Bountiful	Bountiful City	Davis	40.8869°N 111.8853°W	27	Simple cycle (x3)	2001/2012		
Currant Creek	PacifiCorp	Juab	39.8214°N 111.8934°W	550	2x1 Combined cycle	2005		
eBay Data Center	Bloom Energy	Salt Lake	40.5606°N 112.0478°W	9.8	Bloom Energy Server	2013/2015		backup power using fuel cells
Gadsby	PacifiCorp	Salt Lake	40.7686°N 111.9289°W	353	Simple cycle (x3)	2002		
Lake Side Power Station	PacifiCorp	Utah	40.3317°N 111.7542°W	1203	2x1 combined cycle (x2)	2007/2014		
Logan City	City of Logan	Cache	41.7258°N 111.8433°W	13.5	Simple cycle (x3)	2002		
Millcreek	St George Water and Energy Services	Washington	37.1121°N 113.5166°W	80	Simple cycle (x2)	2006/2010		
Murray	Murray City	Salt Lake	40.6700°N 111.8900°W	36	Simple cycle (x3)	2001/2002		
Nebo Power Station	Utah Associated Municipal Power Systems	Utah	40.0614°N 111.7294°W	150	1x1 combined cycle	2004		
Tesoro Refinery Plant	Tesoro Corporation	Salt Lake	40.7931°N 111.9038°W	22	Simple cycle (x2)	2004		
US Magnesium Plant	US Magnesium	Tooele	40.9133°N 112.7339°W	33	Simple cycle (x3)	1972		
West Valley Generation Project	Utah Municipal Power Agency	Salt Lake	40.6667°N 112.0317°W	189	Simple cycle (x5)	2001/2002		
Veyo Waste Heat Recovery	Utah Municipal Power Agency	Washington	37.3480°N 113.7650°W	8.4	ORC generator	2016		waste heat recovery from gas turbines

== Renewable power stations ==
Data from the U.S. Energy Information Administration serves as a general reference.

=== Biomass ===
Name	Operator	County	Coordinates	Capacity (MW)	Generation type	Fuel	Initially opened	Ref	Note
Blue Mountain Biogas	Alpental Energy Partners	Beaver	38.1739°N 113.2972°W	3.0	Reciprocating engine (x2)	Biogas	2012		methane from pig waste
Salt Lake Energy Systems	DTE Energy	Salt Lake	40.7461°N 112.0339°W	3.1	Reciprocating engine (x3)	Landfill gas	2006		
Trans-Jordan Generating Station	Granger Waste Services	Salt Lake	40.5500°N 112.0631°W	4.5	Reciprocating engine (x3)	Landfill gas	2009		

=== Geothermal ===
Name	Operator	County	Coordinates	Capacity (MW)	Initially opened	Ref
Blundell Geothermal Facility	Pacificorp	Beaver	38.4889°N 112.8533°W	34	1984	
Cove Fort Geothermal Power Plant	Enel Green Power	Beaver	38.5603°N 112.5811°W	25	2013	
Thermo No. 1 Geothermal Project	Cyrq Energy	Beaver	38.1607°N 113.1945°W	14	2008	

=== Hydroelectric ===
Name	Operator	County	Coordinates	Capacity (MW)	Initially opened	Ref
Echo Park Dam	U.S. Bureau of Reclamation	Uintah		200	Proposed	
Flaming Gorge Dam	U.S. Bureau of Reclamation	Uintah	40.9146°N 109.4217°W	152	1964	
Cutler Hydroelectric; Power Plant Historic District	Pacificorp	Box Elder	41.8347°N 112.0521°W	30	1924	
Jordanelle Dam Hydro	Central Utah Water; Conservancy District	Wasatch	40.5966°N 111.4236°W	12.6	2008	
Olmsted Hydroelectric; Power Plant Historic District	Rocky Mountain Power	Utah	40.3158°N 111.6547°W	10.3	1904	
Deer Creek Dam Hydro	Provo River Water; Users Association	Wasatch	40.4044°N 111.5284°W	5	1958	
Pioneer Penstock Hydroelectric; Power Plant Historic District	Pacificorp	Weber	41.2436°N 111.9465°W	5	1897	
Little Cottonwood Hydro	City of Murray	Salt Lake	40.5850°N 111.8006°W	4.8	1983	
Echo Dam Hydro	City of Bountiful	Summit	40.9648°N 111.4339°W	4.4	1987	
Devil's Gate-Weber Hydroelectric; Power Plant	Pacificorp	Weber	41.1376°N 111.8849°W	3.85	1910	
Spanish Fork Hydro	Strawberry Water; Users Association	Utah	40.0800°N 111.6048°W	3.6	1983	
Granite Hydroelectric; Power Plant Historic District	Rocky Mountain Power	Salt Lake	40.6192°N 111.7821°W	2	1897	
Pineview Dam Hydro	City of Bountiful	Weber	41.2543°N 111.8485°W	1.8	1991	
Stairs Station Hydroelectric; Power Plant Historic District	Rocky Mountain Power	Salt Lake	40.6236°N 111.7533°W	1.2	1895	
Upper American Fork Hydroelectric; Power Plant Historic District (decommissioned 2007)	Rocky Mountain Power	Utah	40°26′16″N 111°43′22″W	1.0	1906	

=== Wind ===
Name	Operator	County	Coordinates	Capacity (MW)	Initially opened	Ref
Latigo Wind Park	Sustainable Power Group	San Juan	37.8867°N 109.3684°W	62.1	2016	
Milford Wind	First Wind	Beaver, Millard	38.5357°N 112.9350°W	306	2011	
Spanish Fork Wind	NRG Energy	Utah	40.0714°N 111.5822°W	18.9	2008	
Tooele Army Depot Wind	Tooele Army Depot	Tooele	40.5030°N 112.3706°W	1.7	2016	

=== Solar photovoltaic ===
Name	Operator	County	Coordinates	Capacity (MW_{AC})	Initially opened	Ref	Note
Green River Energy Center	rPlus Energies	Emery	38.98285°N 111.13101°W	400	2026		includes 400 MW BESS
Enterprise Solar Farm	Swinerton Renewable Energy	Iron	37.6411°N 113.6125°W	80	2016		
Escalante Solar Project	Swinerton Renewable Energy	Beaver	38.5008°N 113.0300°W	240	2016		
Fiddlers Canyon Solar Project	SunEdison	Iron	37.7503°N 113.2537°W	9	2016		
Hunter Solar Project	Swinerton Renewable Energy	Emery	39.1422°N 111.0511°W	100	2020		
Pavant Solar Project	juwi	Millard	39.1545°N 112.3598°W	120	2016		
Quichapa Solar Project	Brahma Group	Iron	37.6582°N 113.2167°W	9	2017		
Red Hills Renewable Energy Park	Swinerton Renewable Energy	Iron	37.8828°N 112.9042°W	80	2015		
Rio Tinto Stadium Array	Real Salt Lake	Salt Lake	40.5829°N 111.8932°W	2.0	2015		
Sage Solar	First Solar	Rich	41.7700°N 111.0600°W	57.6	2019		
Seven Sisters Solar Project	TerraForm Power	Beaver and Iron	various	20.2	2016		
Three Cedars Solar Project	Swinerton Renewable Energy	Iron	37.7212°N 113.1516°W	210	2016		
Three Peaks Solar Facility	Swinerton Renewable Energy	Iron	37.8271°N 113.1371°W	80	2016		
Graphite Solar 1	Greenbacker Renewable Energy	Carbon	39.5540°N, -110.7150°W	80	2022		

- Natural Bridges National Monument Solar Power System, 50 kW
- Soleil Lofts, 5.3MW with 12.8MWh battery

== Nuclear power stations ==
Although there are currently no nuclear power stations in Utah, the Blue Castle Project is building the state's first nuclear power plant near Green River, Utah. It is projected to be completed in 2030.
