= Seven Sisters Solar Project =

Photovoltaic power station in Utah

- Country: United States
- Location: Beaver County, Iron County
- Coordinates: 37°43′16″N 113°09′06″W
- Status: Operational
- Construction began: September 2014
- Commission date: September 2015
- Owner: TerraForm Power
- Operator: TerraForm Power

Solar farm
- Type: Flat-panel PV fixed tilt

Power generation
- Nameplate capacity: 22.6 MW_{p}, 20.2 MW_{AC}

Seven Sisters Solar Project is a 22.6 MW_{p} (20.2 MW_{AC}) photovoltaic power station consisting of seven units dispersed across Beaver County and Iron County, Utah. The project was developed by SunEdison, built by Swinerton Renewable Energy, and completed in September 2016. The electricity is being sold to Rocky Mountain Power under seven separate 20-year power purchase agreements.

== Project details ==
The project consists of seven separate units distributed on private land at sunny and cool elevations near 6,000 feet.

Seven Sisters Solar Project
Unit	Capacity MW_{AC}	Rating MW_{p}	Coordinates	County
Beryl	3.0	3.4	37°38′21″N 113°38′45″W	Iron
Buckhorn	3.0	3.4	38°01′24″N 112°43′54″W	Iron
Cedar Valley	3.0	3.4	37°48′28″N 113°05′24″W	Iron
Greenville	2.2	2.5	38°15′22″N 112°44′09″W	Beaver
Granite Peak	3.0	3.3	38°24′10″N 112°59′20″W	Beaver
Laho	3.0	3.3	38°17′29″N 113°02′08″W	Beaver
Milford Flat	3.0	3.3	38°17′29″N 113°00′30″W	Beaver

Planning for the project was initiated by the independent renewable energy developer First Wind (founded 2002) which began expanding into photovoltaic energy around 2012. First Wind and its extensive portfolio of assets in western Utah were acquired by SunEdison and its TerraForm Power yield co in November 2014.

Construction of Seven Sisters began several months later in April 2015. Construction progressed simultaneously at all seven sites, created 135 construction jobs at the peak, and was completed by September 2015. The electricity is expected to power more than 4,000 homes. The project is operated and maintained by TerraForm Power.

SunEdison filed for Chapter 11 bankruptcy protection on April 21, 2016. TerraForm retained ownership of the already completed Seven Sisters facility following the restructuring.

== See also ==
- Solar power in Utah
- List of power stations in Utah
