= Red Hills Renewable Energy Park =

Solar power station in Utah, USA

- Country: United States
- Location: Parowan Valley, Iron County
- Coordinates: 37°52′58″N 112°54′15″W
- Status: Operational
- Construction began: October 2014
- Commission date: December 2015
- Construction cost: $188 million
- Owners: Google, Macquarie
- Operator: Swinerton Renewable Energy

Solar farm
- Type: Flat-panel PV single-axis tracking
- Site area: 632 acres (2.56 km^{2})

Power generation
- Nameplate capacity: 104 MW_{p}, 80 MW_{AC}
- Capacity factor: 29.4% (average 2016-2019)
- Annual net output: 206 GW·h, 326 MW·h/acre

Red Hills Renewable Energy Park is a 104 MW_{p} (80 MW_{AC}) photovoltaic power plant located about 3 miles northwest of the town of Parowan in Iron County, Utah. It was the largest solar facility in the state when it came online in December, 2015. The power is being sold under a 20-year power purchase agreement to Rocky Mountain Power which serves customers in Utah, Idaho, and Wyoming.

== Project details ==
The project takes advantage of the abundant sunshine at a cool high elevation of over 6,000 feet in the Parowan Valley. It is located on 632 acres of private land close to an existing Rocky Mountain Power substation. The project includes a visitor center named for the late Dennis Stowell, a state senator who represented Iron County.

The project was developed by the Norwegian firm Scatec Solar starting in 2011, and was originally estimated to cost up to $500 million. Google and Prudential Capital eventually came online as investors in the project in late 2014 with tax equity and debt financing support; with Google and Scatec Solar to retain joint ownership of the completed facility. Construction was anticipated to create approximately 120 to 200 jobs, of which 80% were to be local.

Construction began in December 2014, and completed in December 2015. Swinerton Renewable Energy served as the EPC contractor. The total investment in the completed facility has been estimated at $188 million (much less than when planning started in 2011 due to the substantial drop in PV panel prices). The 340,784 modules are expected to produce 210 million kilowatt hours of electricity each year, enough to supply about 18,500 homes.

On December 29, 2016 it was announced that Scatec Solar had sold its ownership interest in the operating facility to the Australian Macquarie Group. Swinerton Renewable Energy operates and maintains the facility.

== Electricity production ==
Generation (MW·h) of Utah Red Hills Renewable Energy Park
Year	Jan	Feb	Mar	Apr	May	Jun	Jul	Aug	Sep	Oct	Nov	Dec	Total
2015												12,281	12,281
2016	10,077	15,475	17,130	17,647	22,433	24,164	25,282	20,355	19,818	16,158	12,084	7,448	208,071
2017	8,466	12,510	18,735	20,576	24,524	26,812	19,976	19,145	17,113	18,000	12,383	11,333	209,574
2018	10,867	12,780	16,525	20,027	23,079	24,802	21,618	21,584	20,745	15,469	12,751	9,232	209,479
2019	10,310	10,863	16,183	19,051	20,282	22,814	21,594	21,982	18,146	17,837	11,086	8,080	198,228
Average Annual Production (years 2016-2019) --->													206,338

== See also ==
- Solar power in Utah
- List of power stations in Utah
