= Marathon Capital =

American boutique investment bank

- Type: Private
- Industry: Financial services
- Founded: 1999; 27 years ago
- Founders: Ted Brandt (CEO); Gregg Elesh
- Headquarters: Chicago, United States
- Services: Investment banking, mergers and acquisitions
- Number of employees: 100 (2021)
- Website: www.marathoncapital.com

Marathon Capital is an American boutique investment bank delivering financial advice to the global energy, infrastructure markets, and clean economy. Marathon Capital specializes in the sale and financing of companies, portfolios and assets within these markets.

Marathon Capital, founded in 1999, is privately held. Investment banking is conducted through wholly owned subsidiary Marathon Capital Markets, LLC and regulated by the Financial Industry Regulatory Authority (FINRA) in the United States and by the Ontario Securities Commission (OSC) in Canada where the firm operates as an Exempt Market Dealer.

Marathon Capital employs over 100 investment bankers in the areas of renewable energy, mergers, acquisitions, restructuring, project finance and capital raisings. The firm has offices in Chicago, New York City, San Francisco, Houston, and London.

== History ==
In 1999, Ted Brandt and Gregg Elesh co-founded Marathon Capital. Brandt is the CEO. Both had backgrounds in commercial finance, leasing, and structured finance. During 2001, Marathon Capital began its focus on alternative energy. The firm competes with “bulge bracket” firms for its engagements. Marathon Capital periodically acts as a co-manager with other investment banks to facilitate client transactions. Marathon Capital has been involved in several wind power mandates from American Wind Capital Corporation (USA), Suzlon Wind Energy Corporation (USA), EchoFirst (USA), SkyPower Corp. (Canada), Allco Finance Group (Australia) and Greenlight Energy (USA).

Marathon Capital has handled the transactions for the following clients: American Wind Capital Company's sale of company and portfolio to Hannon Armstrong; Suzlon's sale of 240MW Big Sky Wind Farm to EverPower, the restructuring and sale of Middlesex Generation to General Electric (landfill gas to electric); Steamboat II/III to Ormat Technologies (Geothermal); the sale of Greenlight Energy to BP plc (Wind), AMP Resources to Enel (Geothermal), Heelstone Energy Holdings LLC to Sammons Renewable Energy, OCI Solar Power’s 66MW Project Ivory to Desri, Empower Energies’ DG Solar Fund, CPV Wind to Iberdrola (Wind), SkyPower Corp. to Lehman Brothers (Wind and Solar) and Ridgeline Energy to Veolia Environment (Wind). The sale of the project by Allco Finance Group generated cash proceeds of A$346 million.

Other transactions Marathon Capital has played a key role in include: the sale of Tehachapi 3.1 GW wind project, the creation of the leading IPP with Pattern Energy and Riverstone Holdings, the formation of a private Yield co for Edison International with AMP Capital and TIAA-CREF, the sale of First Wind to SunEdison and Terraform, and the sale of Alterra and development pipeline to Innergex.

== Operations ==
Marathon Capital employs over 100 investment bankers in the areas of capital raising, commercial finance, engineering, mergers and acquisitions, power plant development, project finance, renewable energy and restructuring for the wind, solar, energy storage, renewable fuels, sustainable technology, e-mobility, hydrogen and distributed generation sectors.

The firm has offices in Chicago, London, New York City, Houston, and San Francisco and a representative office in Canada.

== Clients ==
Marathon Capital's clients include developers, independent power producers, utilities, government entities, oil and gas companies and energy service providers focused on buying, selling, capitalizing, leveraging and/or restructuring a specific situation, company, project or asset. Marathon Capital has completed transactions involving district energy, cogeneration, geothermal power, wind power, solar power, landfill gas, demand-side energy conservation and has interest in additional transactions focusing on alternative fuel and chemicals, biomass power, energy management system, fuel cell, hydro, and energy-efficiency.
