= Wind power in Utah =

Electricity from wind in one U.S. state

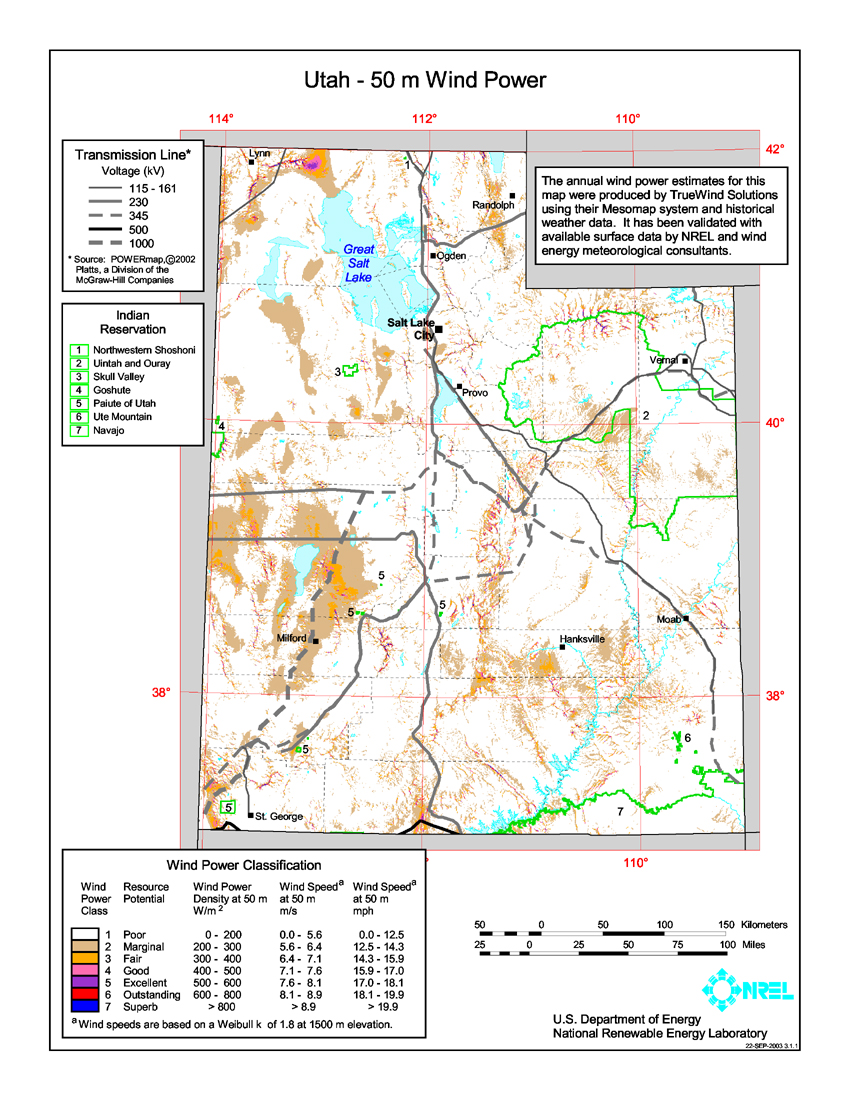
2003 map of wind potential in Utah by United States Department of Energy National Renewable Energy Laboratory

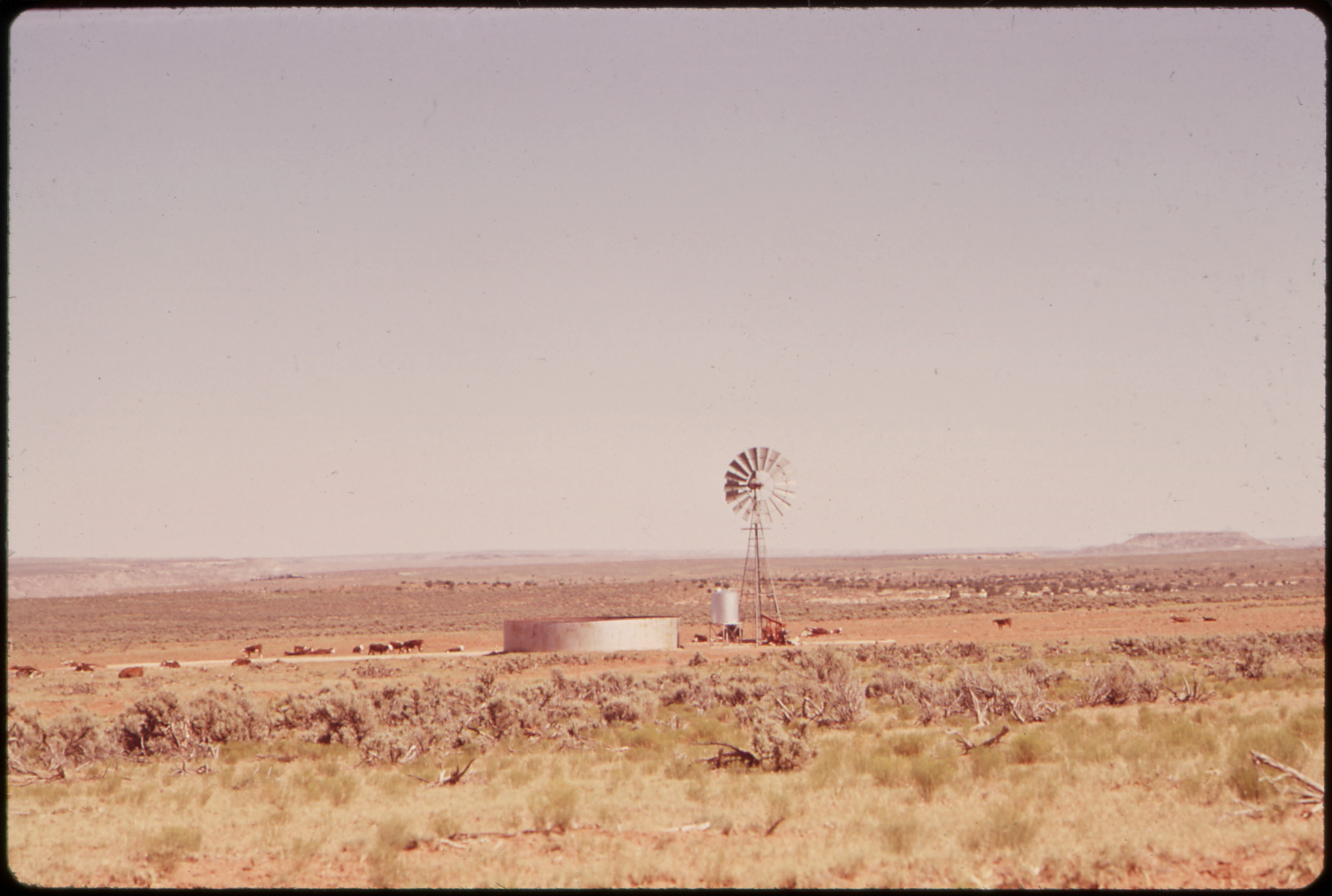
Water pump in southeastern Utah, 1972

Wind power in Utah is in the early stages of development. As of 2016 the state had 391 MW of wind generation capacity, responsible for 2.6% of in-state electricity generation. Wind thus plays a small role in the state's renewable portfolio standard goals.

A 2009 Utah Renewable Energy Zone Taskforce estimated that the state could produce over 9,000 megawatts of wind power. As about 80% of Utah's population is concentrated along the foot of the Wasatch Front mountain range, reliable and predictable canyon winds offer opportunities for wind power generation and efficient wind energy distribution without long-distance transmission.

Utah Power, now PacifiCorp, launched the Blue Sky Program in 2000 to encourage users to purchase imported wind power, with the option of purchasing 100-kilowatt hour (kWh) "blocks" of renewable energy for a monthly fee through their electricity bills. In 2003, radio station KZMU in southeast Utah began operating solely on wind power. Kinkos also participates. PacifiCorp, the major provider in Utah, imports much of its renewable energy into the state, and did not intend to build instate facilities before at least 2024.

== Wind farms ==
The first utility-scale wind farm was built at Spanish Fork in 2008.

The 306 MW Milford Wind Corridor Project has been the largest wind farm in Utah since its completion in 2011.

== Statistics ==
Utah wind generation capacity by year
Megawatts of installed generating capacity

Utah wind generation (GWh, million kWh)
Year	Total	Jan	Feb	Mar	Apr	May	Jun	Jul	Aug	Sep	Oct	Nov	Dec
2008	24	0	0	0	0	0	0	3	3	3	4	5	6
2009	159	5	4	5	4	3	3	2	3	33	47	15	35
2010	448	30	15	45	43	50	37	36	59	39	26	26	42
2011	571	16	54	60	43	56	70	56	64	21	36	65	30
2012	704	33	38	98	61	79	93	56	39	33	40	55	79
2013	640	22	31	40	32	61	71	54	53	56	45	47	28
2014	659	27	70	74	54	71	72	58	50	37	38	56	52
2015	624	30	40	47	60	56	59	69	52	65	31	53	62
2016	821	38	26	84	48	65	82	85	67	77	89	60	100
2017	857	90	94	81	69	69	68	50	53	53	66	89	75
2018	795	60	58	87	64	59	82	61	76	75	57	62	54
2019	820	63	97	68	64	64	65	74	67	75	66	56	61
2020	802	65	68	87	42	79	73	78	78	52	58	72	50
2021	825	61	74	79	55	74	72	53	68	59	64	58	108
2022	60	60											

== See also ==
- Solar power in Utah
- Wind power in the United States
- List of wind farms
