= Lloyd Center Tower =

Office building in Portland, Oregon, U.S.

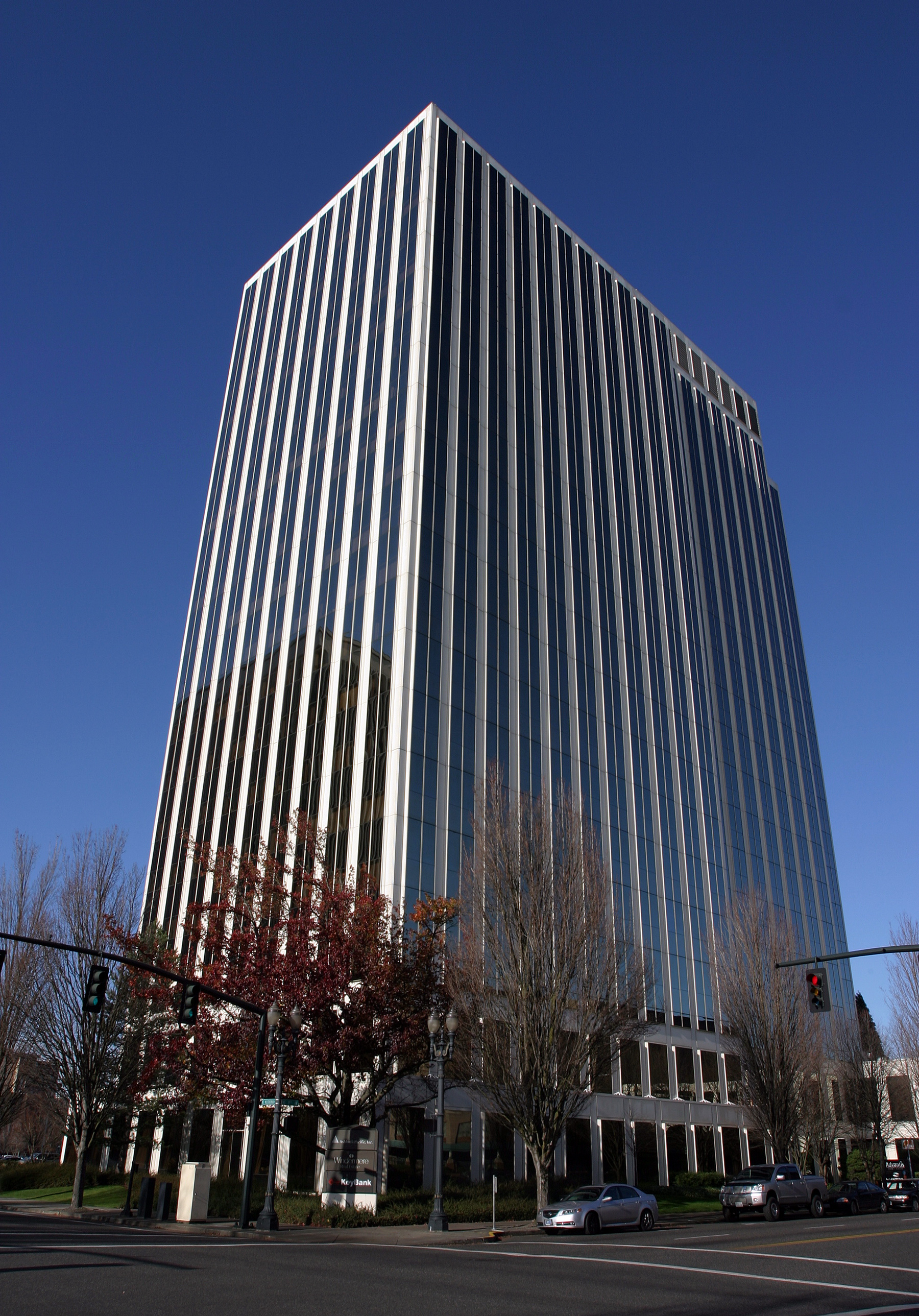
- Lloyd Center Tower from street level

- Location within Portland, Oregon

General information
- Type: Commercial offices
- Location: Portland, Oregon
- Coordinates: 45.5319°N 122.6574°W
- Completed: 1981

Height
- Roof: 88 m (289 ft)

Technical details
- Floor count: 20

Design and construction
- Architect: John Graham & Associates

The Lloyd Center Tower is a 290 foot (88-meter) tall office tower in the Lloyd District of Portland, Oregon. At 20 stories, it is the tallest building in Oregon East of the Willamette River.

It was designed by John Graham & Associates and was completed in 1981. Companies who have occupied the tower include Durst Buildings Corp., who sold the tower to PacifiCorp in 1994. PacifiCorp sold 50% of the office space in the tower in 1995 to Ashforth Pacific, Inc. A skybridge that connected the publicly accessible second floor to Lloyd Center across Northeast 9th Avenue has been removed due to demolition of the former Nordstrom section of Lloyd Center, with said section being built back up as a live music venue.

== See also ==
- Architecture of Portland, Oregon
- List of tallest buildings in Portland, Oregon
