= Milford Wind =

Wind farm in Utah, United States

Milford Wind I & II
- Country: United States
- Location: Beaver and Millard counties, Utah
- Coordinates: 38°33′44″N 112°56′16″W
- Status: Operational
- Construction began: 14 November 2008
- Commission date: 16 November 2009 (I); 2 May 2011 (II)
- Owner: SunEdison
- Operator: SunEdison

Wind farm
- Type: Onshore

Power generation
- Units operational: 58 X 2.5 MW (Clipper); 107 X 1.5 MW (GE)
- Make and model: Clipper Liberty C100; GE Energy 1.5SLE
- Nameplate capacity: 306 MW
- Capacity factor: 22.7% (average 2012-2019)
- Annual net output: 609 GW·h

The Milford Wind Corridor Project, also called Milford Wind, is a 306 megawatt (MW) wind farm spanning Beaver and Millard County north of Milford, Utah. It became the state's largest wind facility when the first phase was completed in 2009. The electricity is being sold to the Southern California Public Power Authority.

== Project details ==
The project was developed and financed in two phases by First Wind. Construction began in November 2008.

The first phase had a posted capacity of 204 MW with 97 wind turbines, including 58 Clipper Liberty 2.5-MW wind turbines and 39 GE Energy 1.5-MW turbines. It went online in November 2009 and supported more than 300 development and construction jobs. First Wind spent about US$30 million with Utah-based businesses developing and building the first phase of the project. Another $50 million was spent statewide on items such as wages and taxes.

A second phase of the project began in July 2010 and foundations were poured in October. The expansion adds another 68 GE 1.5-MW turbines for a total of an additional 102 MW. On 9 May 2011 the company announced that Phase II was online.

There is a proposal to build a third phase located 45 miles south of Delta, Utah with up to 300 wind turbines.

The 240 MW Escalante Solar Project went online in September 2016, located southwest of Milford Wind.

First Wind was acquired by SunEdison in November 2014.

== Electricity production ==
Milford Wind Corridor Electricity Generation (MW·h)
| Year | Milford Wind 1 (204 MW Unit) | Milford Wind 2 (102 MW Unit) | Total Annual MW·h |
|---|---|---|---|
| 2010 | 400,751 | - | 400,751 |
| 2011 | 414,420 | 110,991* | 525,411 |
| 2012 | 457,145 | 206,775 | 663,920 |
| 2013 | 338,529 | 155,246 | 493,775 |
| 2014 | 415,968 | 199,197 | 615,165 |
| 2015 | 392,419 | 187,583 | 580,002 |
| 2016 | 455,189 | 214,357 | 669,546 |
| 2017 | 442,501 | 212,006 | 654,507 |
| 2018 | 394,366 | 197,100 | 591,466 |
| 2019 | 401,083 | 200,272 | 601,355 |
| Average Annual Production (years 2012-2019) ---> | | | 608,717 |

(*) partial year of operation

== See also ==
- List of wind farms
- Wind power in Utah
- Wind power in the United States
