= Strasskirchen Solar Park =

Photovoltaic power station in Bavaria,

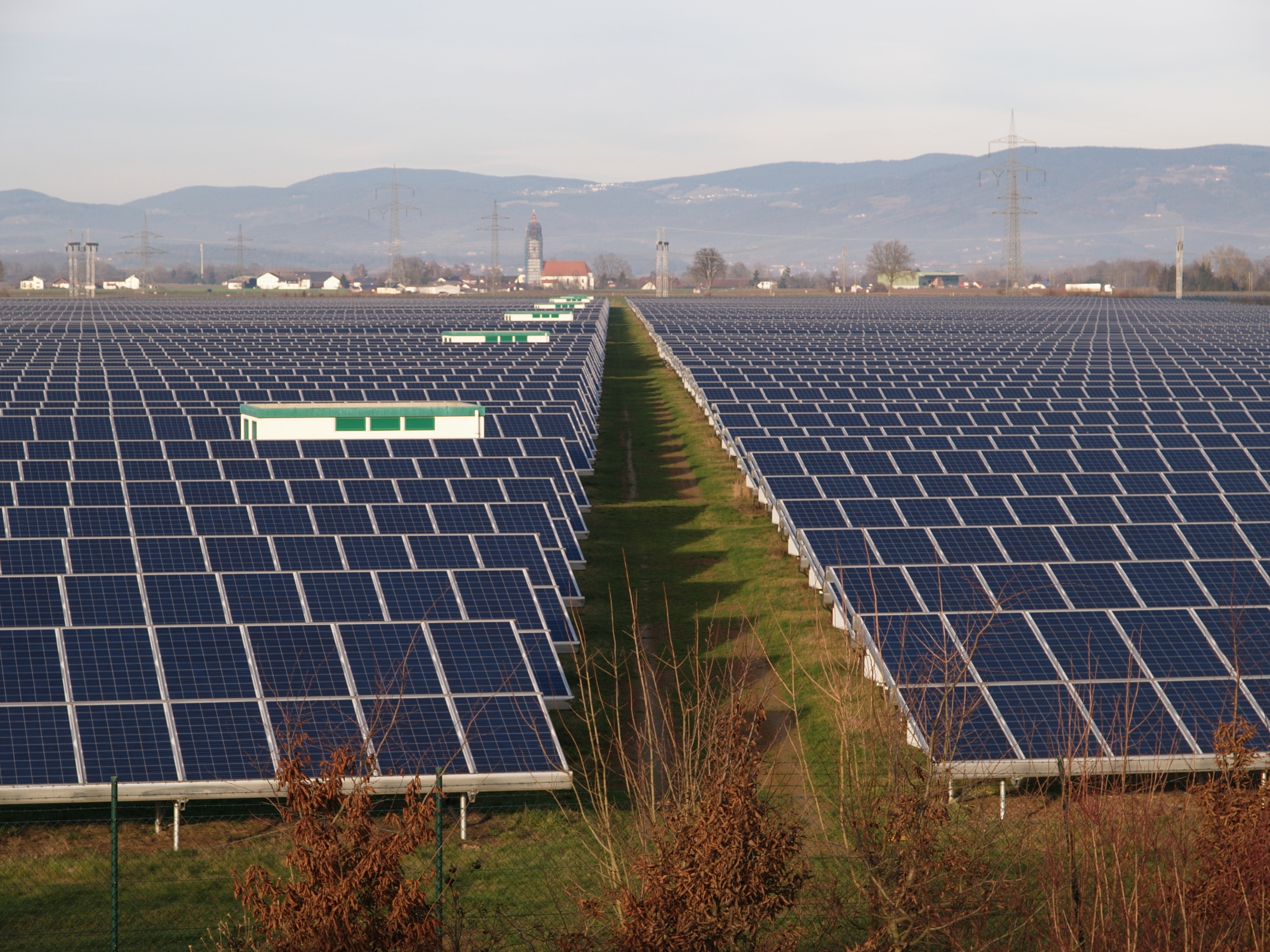
- Country: Germany
- Location: Straßkirchen
- Coordinates: 48°48′25″N 12°45′37″E
- Status: Operational
- Commission date: December 2009
- Owners: Qcells; SunEdison

Solar farm
- Type: Flat-panel PV
- Site area: 135 hectares Footprint

Power generation
- Nameplate capacity: 54 MW

External links
- Commons: Related media on Commons

The Strasskirchen Solar Park is a large photovoltaic power station in Bavaria, with an installed capacity of 54 MW. It was developed by a joint venture of MEMC and Q-Cells in 2009. At this time this Solar Park was the second largest PV Power Plant. Q-Cells also provided the solar modules for the facility which is located in Straßkirchen, Bavaria, Germany.

== See also ==
- List of photovoltaic power stations
