= Nabeel Gareeb =

Pakistani-American businessman (born 1964)

- Born: Nabeel Gareeb; 1964; Karachi, Sindh, Pakistan
- Citizenship: United States of America
- Education: Harvey Mudd College, Electrical Engineering(B.S.); Claremont Graduate University, Engineering Management(M.S.)
- Occupation: Businessman
- Years active: 2002–2008
- Known for: President and CEO of MEMC Electronic Materials (2002–2008)
- Title: President and CEO
- Board member of: MEMC Electronic Materials

Nabeel Gareeb (born 1964) is a Memon Pakistani-American businessman. He was the president and chief executive officer, as well as a member of the board of directors, of MEMC (now SunEdison) between 30 April 2002 and 12 November 2008.

== Early life and education ==
Gareeb was born in 1964 in Karachi, Pakistan, to a father who worked as a textile importer and a mother who was a gynaecologist. When his parents relocated to Saudi Arabia for work, Gareeb, then fourteen, remained in Pakistan on his own; he finished high school at fifteen and worked as a factory manager while preparing for the SAT. He did not perform well on the SAT on his first two attempts before achieving a score sufficient for admission to Harvey Mudd College in Claremont, California, where he earned a Bachelor of Science degree in electrical engineering. He subsequently immigrated to the United States and later earned a Master of Science degree in engineering management from Claremont Graduate School.

== Career ==
Prior to joining MEMC, Gareeb worked for ten years at the International Rectifier Corporation, a supplier of power semiconductors, where he was most recently chief operating officer.

He was appointed president and chief executive officer, and a member of the board of directors, of MEMC Electronic Materials on 30 April 2002. He resigned both positions in October 2008, effective 12 November 2008, with board member Marshall Turner serving as interim CEO while a permanent successor was sought.

== Achievements ==
According to a 2007 list compiled by Forbes, Gareeb was one of the highest-paid CEOs in the United States. He was also listed among the twenty-five highest-paid men in the United States by Fortune. Forbes described him as ranking first within the semiconductor sector at age 43. His total compensation for the five-year period from 2003 to 2008 was estimated at 106.06 million US dollars.
