= Solar power in Utah =

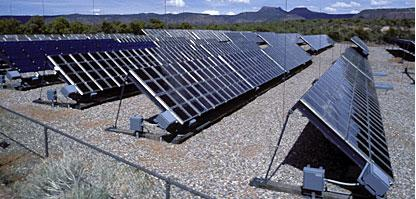
50 kW photovoltaic array installed June 1980 at Natural Bridges National Monument

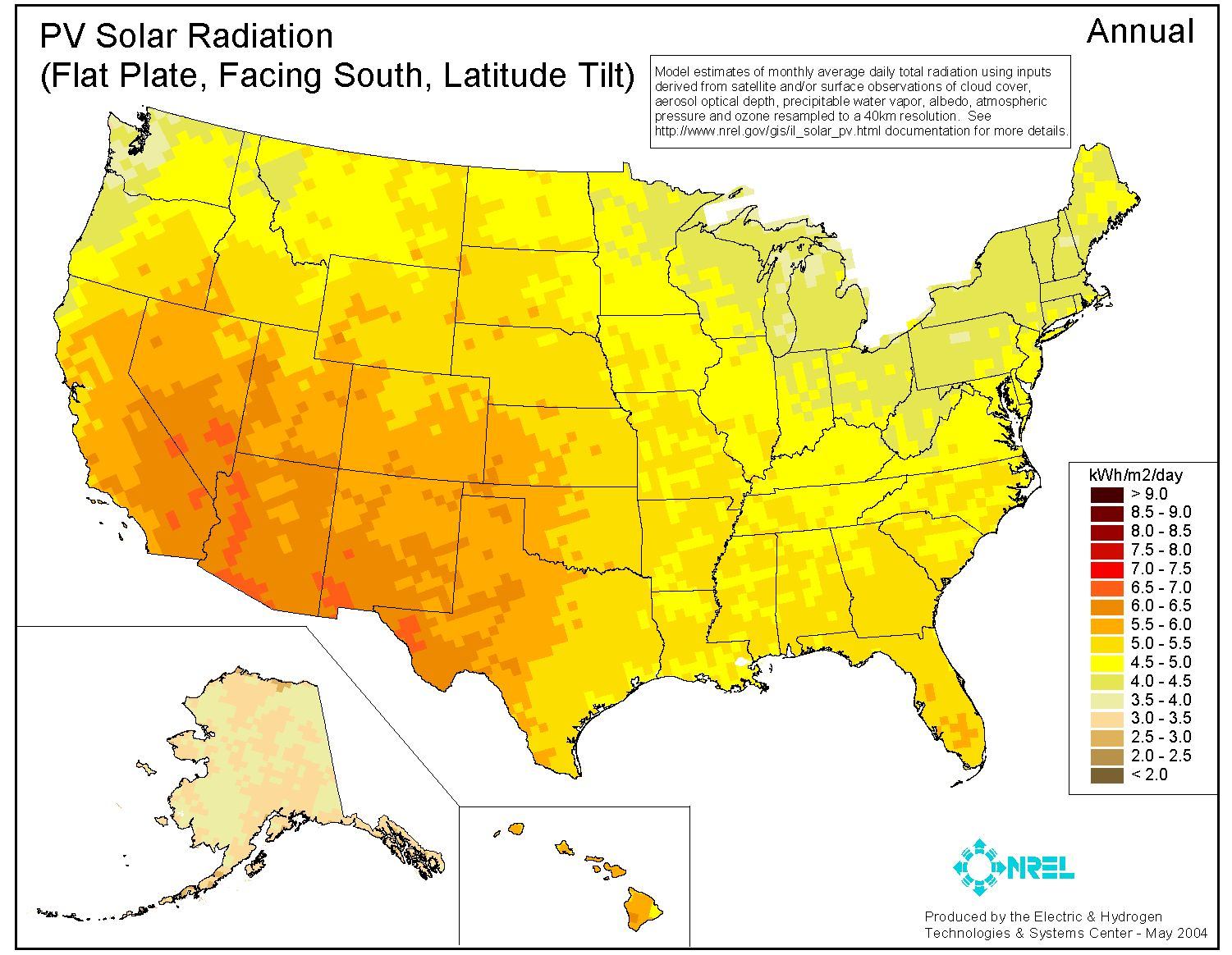
US annual average solar energy received by a latitude tilt photovoltaic cell (modeled)

The U.S. state of Utah has the solar potential to provide all of the electricity used in the United States. Utah is one of the seven states with the best potential for solar power, along with California, Nevada, Arizona, New Mexico, Colorado, and Texas. Utah's only investor owned utility (PacifiCorp - doing business as Rocky Mountain Power (RMP)) currently allows partial net metering (net billing service - Schedule 137) for residential systems up to 25 kW and up to 2 MW for non-residential users. In the past, RMP allowed full net metering (Schedule 135), and partial net metering (Schedule 136, providing approximately a 90% credit for each kWh exported to RMP). Neither of these Schedules allows for new customers to sign up any longer. Utah's municipal utilities and electric cooperatives set their own net metering policies.

Utah has a renewable portfolio standard in statute, but it is not a binding standard. It set a goal for obtaining 20% of electricity from renewable sources by 2025 – but only if doing so is cost-effective compared to other available alternatives. In 2024 it met and exceeded this goal, producing roughly 22% of its electricity from renewable sources, the vast majority of which were solar.

Since 2011, with the 30% federal tax credit, prices have decreased to the point that they provide an attractive return on investment. Utah allows a tax credit for residential and commercial renewable energy systems. The tax credit is being phased out, it initially allowed for up to a $2,000 tax credit (35% of system cost) for residential systems and up to a $50,000 credit (10% of system cost) for commercial systems. St. George offers a $2000/kW (AC) rebate of up to $6,000 for residential systems, and up to $20,000 for commercial systems. A similar offer had been available from RMP ($1.10/watt (AC) through an auction process each year), but in March 2016 the program was terminated by the Utah Legislature Senate Bill SB0115.

== Usage and production ==
Utah's energy consumption consists of both fossil fuels and renewable resources. In 2009, residents, business and industries combined, consumed approximately 27,411 gigawatt-hours (GWh) of electricity; 0.01% of which was solar generated. Of the total energy produced, 1,090 trillion British thermal units (320 TWh), in 2009 a fraction of 0.1% was solar generated.

Solar energy production via residential net-metering has increased steadily since 2008. From 2008 to 2009, the number of households participating in the program grew fivefold, placing Utah 18th, in the country. In 2024 Utah ranked 16th in the nation for total amount of solar capacity (2,780 megawatts), with 4/5 coming from utility scale facilities.

According to Utah Governor Herbert's 10-Year Strategic Energy Plan, 72% of crude oil used in transportation, comes from out of state sources; pursuance of clean technology for nontraditional fuels is "critical to [Utah's] economy, air quality and quality of life".

== Photovoltaics ==
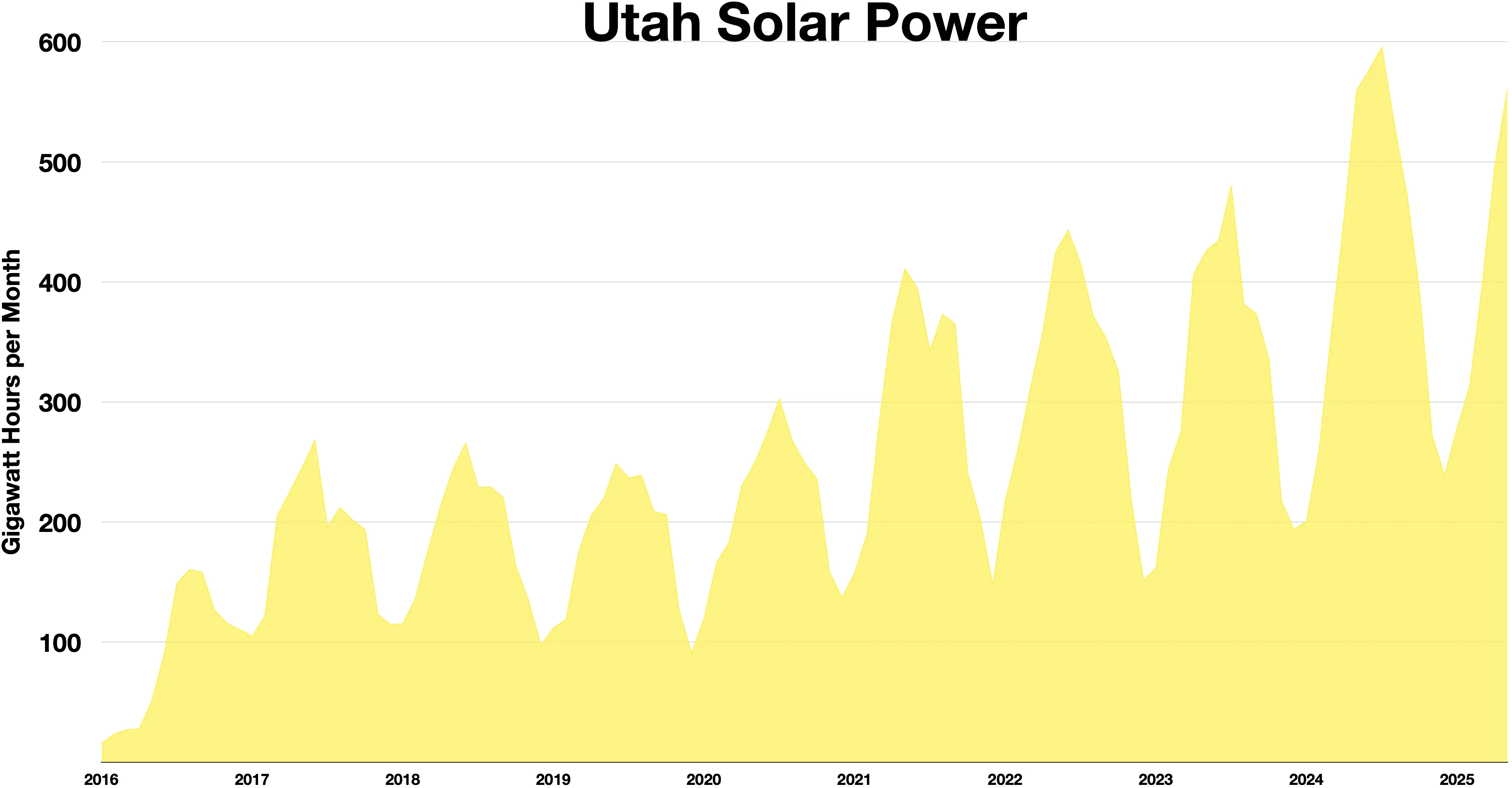
Utah solar power

Grid-connected PV capacity (MWp)
Year	Photovoltaics		
Year	Capacity	Installed	% change
2007	0.2		
2008	0.2		0%
2009	0.6	0.4	200%
2010	2.1	1.4	250%
2011	4.4	2.3	110%
2012	10.0	5.6	127%
2013	16.0	6.0	60%
2014	24	8	50%
2015	255	231	962%
2016	1,496	1,241	487%
2017	1,606	110	7%
2018	1,651	45	3%
2019	1,771.2	120.2	7%
2020	2,203.1	431.9	24%
2021	2,598	394.9	%
2022	2,783	185	%

=== Campuses and research ===
Utah's public universities have expanded campus- and portfolio-scale solar procurement alongside research on grid integration and electrified transport. The University of Utah entered into a power-purchase agreement for the Castle Solar Project, a 40-MWac facility in Emery County that began construction in 2021 and contributes a significant share of the university's electricity mix. In 2024 the Elektron Solar Project in Tooele County reached commercial operation; the project supplies power to several Utah customers, enabling Utah Valley University to meet about 92% of its campus electricity use with renewable energy.

At Weber State University, a donor-funded, solar-powered “W” lighting installation was unveiled in 2023, reflecting a broader campus sustainability program and drawing public discussion about lighting impacts and monitoring.

Utah institutions also contribute to solar technology and integration research. The National Renewable Energy Laboratory (NREL) has funded multi-year awards to accelerate lower-cost, higher-efficiency cadmium-telluride PV manufacturing through the Cadmium Telluride Accelerator Consortium, supporting supply-chain and cost-reduction efforts that benefit Southwestern solar deployment, including in Utah. In parallel, Utah State University’s ASPIRE Engineering Research Center tests wireless in-road EV charging in Logan as a pathway to integrating more renewable electricity into transportation energy use.

=== Solar farms ===
Many utility-scale (larger than about 2 MW) solar farms have been constructed in western Utah since 2015, servicing consumers in Utah and adjacent states. The 240 MW Escalante Solar Project adjacent to Milford Wind in Beaver County is the largest facility as of year 2019.

=== Residential solar ===
The Salt Lake Tribune reported that about 2,700 customers of Rocky Mountain Power had solar arrays as of May 2014, a number that was growing by 30% a year.

Rocky Mountain Power, a subsidy of PacifiCorp and utility provider for the state of Utah, offers incentives between $0.60 and $1.25 per watt generated by participants in net metering.

== Solar thermal ==
Utah has the potential to generate 1,500,000 GWh/year from 826 GW of concentrated solar power (CSP) plants using 6,371 square miles - about 7.5% of the state. CSP has the advantage over photovoltaics of integrating storage, allowing 24-hour operation, and allowing the hourly output to track demand, with the balance stored as heat. CSP is not able to compensate for seasonal changes, although in the southwest peak demand correlates with peak solar output, due to air conditioning loads. Utah is one of 11 states each able to provide all of the electricity used in the United States from CSP.

== State legislation ==
Utah's solar easement provisions are similar to those in other states, in that parties may voluntarily enter into written contracts, enforceable by law, that once created run with the land. However, The Utah Public Service Commission plans to execute a cost-benefit analysis of consumer-produced electricity and its effects on the current electrical system. This study may set national precedent, as no state's regulatory agency has conducted a full-scale examination of net-metered solar power. The study does not consider the benefits of clean energy on health and the environment. It evaluates the solar-generated energy as if it were generated by coal, the major source of power in Utah. Many eastern states do value their clean energy with cap-and-trade legislation. Utah also provides a nonrefundable and refundable tax credit for qualifying solar projects.

A bill in the Utah Senate, SB0115, sponsored by Senator Stuart J. Adams, put an end to the Rocky Mountain Power Solar Incentive Program in March 2016. The bill was titled "Sustainable Transportation and Energy Plan Act" but contained language that lacked support for solar energy, even after several amendments. Some claimed that the complex bill was aimed to bypass the oversight of the Public Service Commission and allow a path to make rooftop solar unattractive. The Senate bill failed a vote in the House of Representatives late in the afternoon of the last day the legislature was in session, and solar proponents were relieved. Later that night, the bill was brought back to the House by Representative V. Lowry Snow for "reconsideration". Another vote was taken, and this time the bill passed.

A previous attempt to change the solar net metering agreement for Rocky Mountain Power was rejected by the Utah Public Service Commission. This brought into question the support for rooftop solar in Utah by the state's largest utility Rocky Mountain Power, which is now owned by Warren Buffett's Berkshire Hathaway Energy (BHE).

=== Utah's solar access law ===
Under Utah Code, Title 10, Chapter 9a, Section 610, provides land use authorities the power to refuse approval or renewal of homeowner association or other private covenants that prohibit "reasonably sited and designed solar collectors, clotheslines, or other energy devices based".

=== Solar easements ===
Voluntary solar easements may be created by property owners to protect long-term access to sunlight. Easements must be "created in writing and shall be filed, duly recorded and indexed in the office of the recorder of the county in which the easement is granted".

== Utah Science Technology and Research Initiative (USTAR) ==
The passage of Utah State Bill 75 in 2006 allocated $179 million to the USTAR Economic Development Initiative, $15 million in ongoing annual funding to research teams at the University of Utah and Utah State University and $160 million towards the construction of new research facilities.

Included in this appropriation is funding for alternative and renewable energy research, including catalysis and solar technologies. Resulting new bioengineering companies include Binergy Scientific, Nanosynth Materials and Sensors, and Nanosynth Energy Technologies.

=== Economic impacts ===
From fiscal years 2007 through 2011, USTAR generated more than $700 million in jobs-related earnings, gross state product, state tax revenue and local tax revenue, as outlined in the table below from a 2012 report by the Bureau of Economic and Business Research at the David Eccles School of Business at the University of Utah.

Fiscal year	Jobs	Earnings	Gross state product	State tax revenue	Local tax revenue
2007	81	$2,875,439	$5,325,218	$251,543	$42,987
2008	380	$14,135,998	$26,906,145	$1,236,617	$211,334
2009	1247	$46,434,837	$83,636,815	$4,062,119	$694,200
2010	2822	$103,467,769	$176,305,186	$9,051,361	$1,546,842
2011	2930	$109,051,162	$191,973,226	$9,609,852	$1,642,287
Totals	N/A	$275,965,205	$484,146,590	$24,181,492	$4,137,650

=== Construction ===
Construction spending for USTAR research facilities has had the largest economic impacts to the state, supporting an average of 801 jobs annually, and generated $143.2 million in Utah jobs earnings. Both facilities, the BioInnovations Center at Utah State University and the Sorenson Molecular Biotechnology Building at the University of Utah, are LEED Gold certified.

==== Sorenson Molecular Biotechnology Building ====
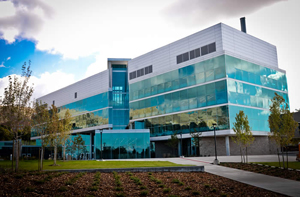
Sorenson Molecular Biotechnology Building

Officially dedicated in 2012, the James L. Sorenson Molecular Biotechnology Building is part of a four-building quadrangle. The 208,000-square-foot building features a transparent design, enabling natural light to enter 75% of the interiors. Built to LEED Gold certification standards, the facility will reduce energy and use costs by nearly 40%. Sustainable features include multistage evaporative cooling systems and low volatile organic compound finishes. Vegetated bioswales, incorporated in the landscaping, collect and filter surface runoff.

A total of 33,000 cubic yards of concrete and 6.8 million pounds of reinforcing steel were used in the construction of the building. Concrete used features high fly ash content. Local, renewably sourced stone and copper were also used in construction.

== Training efforts ==
After a ranking of 34th in the nation, Utah has taken greater steps to produce green jobs within the state. The creation of Intermountain Weatherization Training center in Clearfield has trained thousands of new workers for green jobs throughout the state, including certified solar installation. The goal of the 14,000-square-foot facility is to use hands-on training with state-of-the-art equipment to train workers in accordance to the U.S. Department of Energy guidelines for home energy professionals. The Intermountain Weatherization Center (IWC) is funded from private contributions, donations, grants, fees, any money appropriated by the Legislature.

== Solar energy zones ==
On April 20, 2012, the Bureau of Land Management identified 17 "Solar Energy Zones" with the best potential for priority solar development. Three of those are in Utah. In addition to the Solar Energy Zones, 18,098,040 acres is available in Utah for solar application permits from the BLM, plus 1,962,671 acres with a variance.

- Escalante Valley - 6,533 acres (26.4 km^{2}) 588 - 1,058 MW 37°55′N 113°27′W
- Milford Flats South - 6,252 acres (25.3 km^{2}) 576 - 1,037 MW 38°11′N 113°04′W
- Wah Wah Valley 5,873 acres (23.8 km^{2}) 542 - 976 MW 38°28′N 113°25′W

== Planned projects ==
=== Utah Solar 1 ===
Energy Capital Group, LLC (ECG) is developing ECG Utah Solar 1, LLC, a 300 MW-AC PV solar plant strategically sited to use existing interstate transmission infrastructure on 1754 acres leased from the Utah School and Institutional Trust Lands (SITLA) less than one mile from the Intermountain Power Project (IPP) north of Delta, Utah.

The project's planned interconnection point is the IPP switchyard which is a point of delivery for the Los Angeles, Anaheim, Riverside, Pasadena, Glendale and Burbank utilities. The switchyard connects to the Southern Transmission System (STS) the 500 HVDC line (Path 27) that travels 488 miles directly to a switchyard in Adelanto, California. LADWP is a California balancing authority and operates the switchyard which makes this project as though it is on California soil for the state Renewable Portfolio Standard (RPS).

=== Utah Olympic Oval Solar Project ===
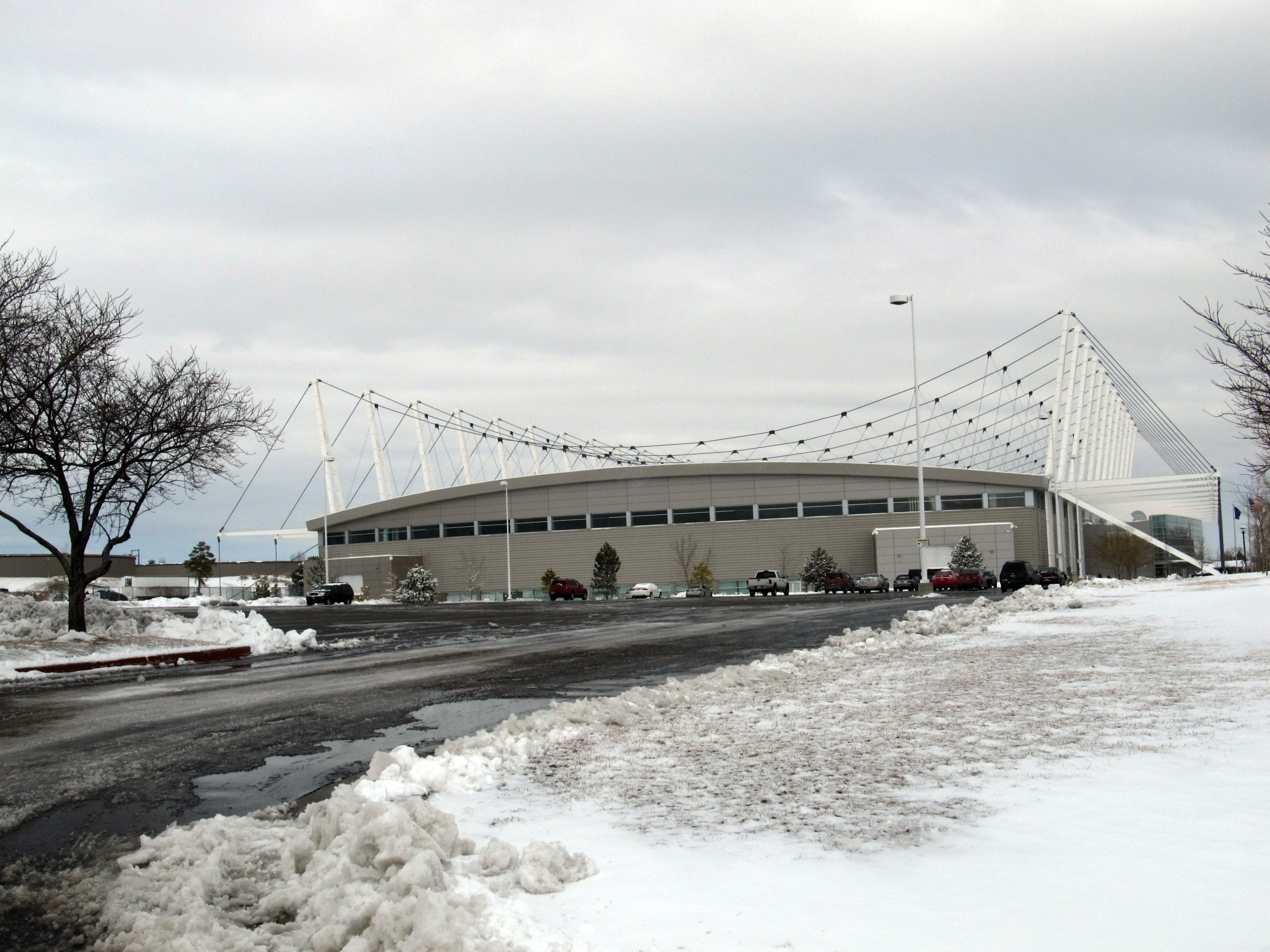
Utah Olympic Oval

The Utah Olympic Oval plans to install more than 3,000 solar panels above parking stalls that will generate some of the power needed to operate the facility. Current project estimates predict the addition of solar panels to save the facility $100,000 of its $750,000 annual power costs.

At a cost of $1.4 million, the Utah Olympic Oval Solar Project is that largest solar project to date of the Utah state Division of Construction and Facilities Management. It is expected to pay for itself in five years and end up saving $3.7 million over its 20-year life.

=== SunSmart Solar Farm ===
SunSmart is a project in St. George to provide residents an opportunity to take advantage of community solar farm. The purchaser is not required to set anything up and there is no maintenance making it a simple risk-free investment. With this program, participants pay $2.95 more per month for each 100 kWh block of power, an increase from $.0671/kWh to $.0966/kWh. These payments help cover the building costs of renewable energy sources, which are typically greater than traditional, carbon-based sources of power. The revenue from this program will allow further development and research for other renewable sources

=== Faraday Solar Project ===
The Faraday Solar Project is a utility-scale photovoltaic solar farm under construction near Fairfield, in northern Utah County, Utah. Developed by Excelsior Energy Capital, the project is expected to generate approximately 682.5 megawatts (MW) of electricity across 3,200 acres, making it the largest solar facility in Utah when completed in Q3 2025.

Originally initiated by developers Parasol and Clēnera, the project was acquired by Excelsior in 2023. In November 2023, Faraday Solar secured $1.3 billion in financing, including tax equity from U.S. Bancorp Impact Finance and debt financing from a consortium led by MUFG and Nord/LB.

The energy generated will be delivered to PacifiCorp under a long-term power purchase agreement (PPA), with the electricity ultimately supplied to Meta Platforms, Inc. to power its regional data center operations.

== See also ==
- List of power stations in Utah
- Wind power in Utah
- Solar power in the United States
- Renewable energy in the United States
