= Upper American Fork Hydroelectric Power Plant Historic District =

Historic district in Utah, United States

- U.S. National Register of Historic Places
- U.S. Historic district
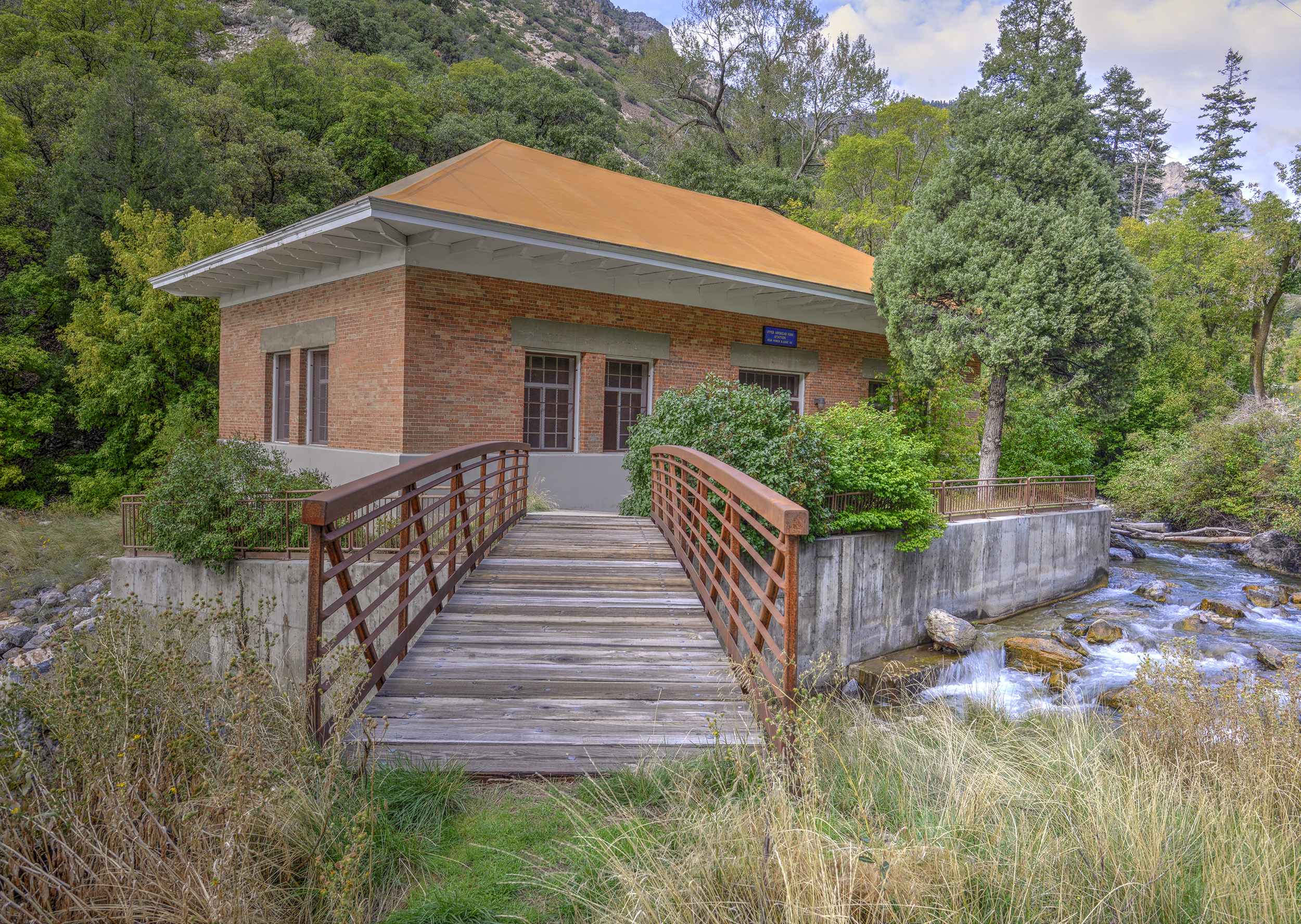
- Upper American Fork Hydroelectric Power Plant, September 2014

- Location within Utah Location within the United States
- Nearest city: Cedar Hills, Utah
- Coordinates: 40°26′16″N 111°43′22″W
- Area: 1.5 acres (0.61 ha)
- Built: 1906
- Architect: Young, Willard; Kelsey, Frank C.
- Architectural style: Bungalow/craftsman, Modern Movement
- MPS: Electric Power Plants of Utah MPS
- NRHP reference No.: 89000278
- Added to NRHP: April 20, 1989

The Upper American Fork Hydroelectric Power Plant Historic District is a 1.5-acre (0.61 ha) historic district in American Fork Canyon in northeastern Utah County, Utah, United States, that is listed on the National Register of Historic Places (NRHP).

== Description ==
The district consists of one contributing building and three contributing structures. It included the power plant; the Upper American Fork Dam, which is about 110 feet (34 m) long and 10 feet (3.0 m) tall, which traps the unnamed stream that flows through the American Fork Canyon (and becomes the American Fork river at the mouth of the canyon); and the pedestrian footbridge over the unnamed stream .

The district was listed on the NRHP on April 20, 1989.

== See also ==
- National Register of Historic Places listings in Utah County, Utah
