= SunEdison =

Global renewable energy company

SunEdison Infrastructure Limited
- Type: Private
- Industry: Renewable energy
- Founded: 1959
- Headquarters: Maryland Heights, Missouri, United States
- Key people: John S. Dubel, chief executive officer and chief restructuring officer Richard Katz, chairman and chief executive officer of reorganized SunEdison
- Products: Polysilicon, Solar Wafers, Photovoltaic Plants, Solar Modules, Solar Energy
- Revenue: US$2.484 billion (2014)
- Operating income: (US$536 million) (2014)
- Number of employees: 7,300 (2014)
- Website: www.sunedison.com

SunEdison, Inc. (formerly MEMC Electronic Materials) was a renewable energy company headquartered in the U.S. In addition to developing, building, owning, and operating solar power plants and wind energy plants, it also manufactures high-purity polysilicon, monocrystalline silicon ingots, silicon wafers, solar modules, solar energy systems, and solar module racking systems. Originally a silicon-wafer manufacturer established in 1959 as the Monsanto Electronic Materials Company, the company was sold by Monsanto in 1989.

It is one of the leading solar power companies worldwide, and with its acquisition of wind energy company First Wind in 2014, SunEdison became the leading renewable energy development company in the world. In 2015, SunEdison sold off its subsidiary SunEdison Semiconductor, marking the completion of SunEdison's transition from a semiconductor-wafer company to a dedicated renewable-energy corporation.

Following years of major expansion and the announcement of the intent—which eventually fell through—to acquire the residential-rooftop solar company Vivint Solar in 2015, SunEdison's stock plummeted, and its more than $11 billion in debt caused it to file for Chapter 11 bankruptcy protection on April 21, 2016, eventually emerging in December 2017 as a restructured, smaller, private company.

== History ==
=== Foundation ===
The establishment of Monsanto Electronic Materials Company (MEMC), a silicon wafer–manufacturing division to serve the emerging electronics industry, was announced on August 6, 1959, as an arm of the U.S.-based multinational corporation Monsanto. In February 1960 MEMC started production of 19mm silicon ingots at its location in St. Peters, Missouri, 30 miles west of Monsanto's headquarters in St. Louis. As one of the first companies to produce semiconductor wafers, MEMC was a pioneer in the field, and some of its innovations became industry standards into the 21st century. MEMC used the Czochralski process (CZ process) of silicon crystal production, and developed the Chemical Mechanical Polishing (CMP) process of wafer finishing. In 1966 MEMC installed its first reactors for the production of epitaxial wafers, and developed zero-dislocation crystal growing, which made large-diameter silicon crystals possible.

=== Expansion ===
In the early 1970s, MEMC opened a production plant in Kuala Lumpur, Malaysia, and sent its St. Peters–produced 2.25-inch ingots there for slicing and polishing. In 1979, MEMC became the first company to manufacture 125mm (5-inch) wafers; in 1981 the first to produce 150mm (6-inch) wafers; and, in partnership with IBM, in 1984 the first to produce 200mm (8-inch) wafers. In 1986 MEMC opened its production and R&D facility in Utsunomiya, Japan to serve the Japanese semiconductor market, becoming the first non-Japanese wafer maker with manufacturing and research facilities in Japan.

=== Change of ownership ===
MEMC experienced heavy price-pressure from Japanese competition during the mid 1980s. Despite its success and increasing revenues, MEMC had to account for losses for a few years, leading to the decision of Monsanto, which was refocusing on chemicals, agriculture, and biotechnology products, to sell the electronic materials division. In 1989 the German company Hüls AG, the chemicals arm of the German conglomerate VEBA, acquired Monsanto Electronic Materials and combined it with Hüls' previous acquisition Dynamite Nobel Silicon (DNS) to form MEMC Electronic Materials. DNS already operated silicon wafer plants in Merano and Novara, Italy and integrated them within the new MEMC Electronic Materials. Hüls supported the new subsidiary with $50 million, for research and development and for manufacturing expansion. In 1991 MEMC developed the first process using granular polysilicon, which provided cost and productivity advantages over "chunk" polysilicon. Four years later MEMC acquired Albemarle Corporation's granular polysilicon production facility in Pasadena, Texas, which had been producing granular polysilicon since 1987.

MEMC's stock began trading on the New York Stock Exchange with an initial public offering in 1995. The IPO raised over $400 million, which went to finance an aggressive growth plan and repay some of the debt to its parent company, and Hüls/VEBA retained a majority interest in the company.

The cyclical downturn in the semiconductor business in the late 1990s hit MEMC hard. In 1998 the company reported a loss of $316 million on revenues of $759 million. In June 2000 VEBA AG, still holding 72% of MEMC, was merged with VIAG to form the new E.ON AG. E.ON wanted to focus on its core business of electric utilities, and assigned Merrill Lynch to sell MEMC. Merrill was unable to find a buyer until MEMC announced that it was on the verge of illiquidity in the middle of 2001. Finally in October 2001 E.ON was able to agree on a deal with the private equity company Texas Pacific Group (TPG), which purchased E.ON's stake in MEMC for a symbolic dollar and offered MEMC $150 million in credit lines. TPG restructured MEMC's debt, increased its stake in the company to 90%, and cut one third of its workforce.

MEMC returned to profitability following the appointment of Nabeel Gareeb, who was CEO of MEMC from April 2002 to November 2008. MEMC's market share rose again and by 2003 it reported positive earning figures. MEMC's sales topped $1 billion in 2004, and it was number three in market share. Through a secondary offering, TPG reduced its share of MEMC in 2005 to 34%, and by the end of 2007, to zero. On October 30, 2008, Gareeb stepped down as president and CEO of the company.

=== Solar market entry ===
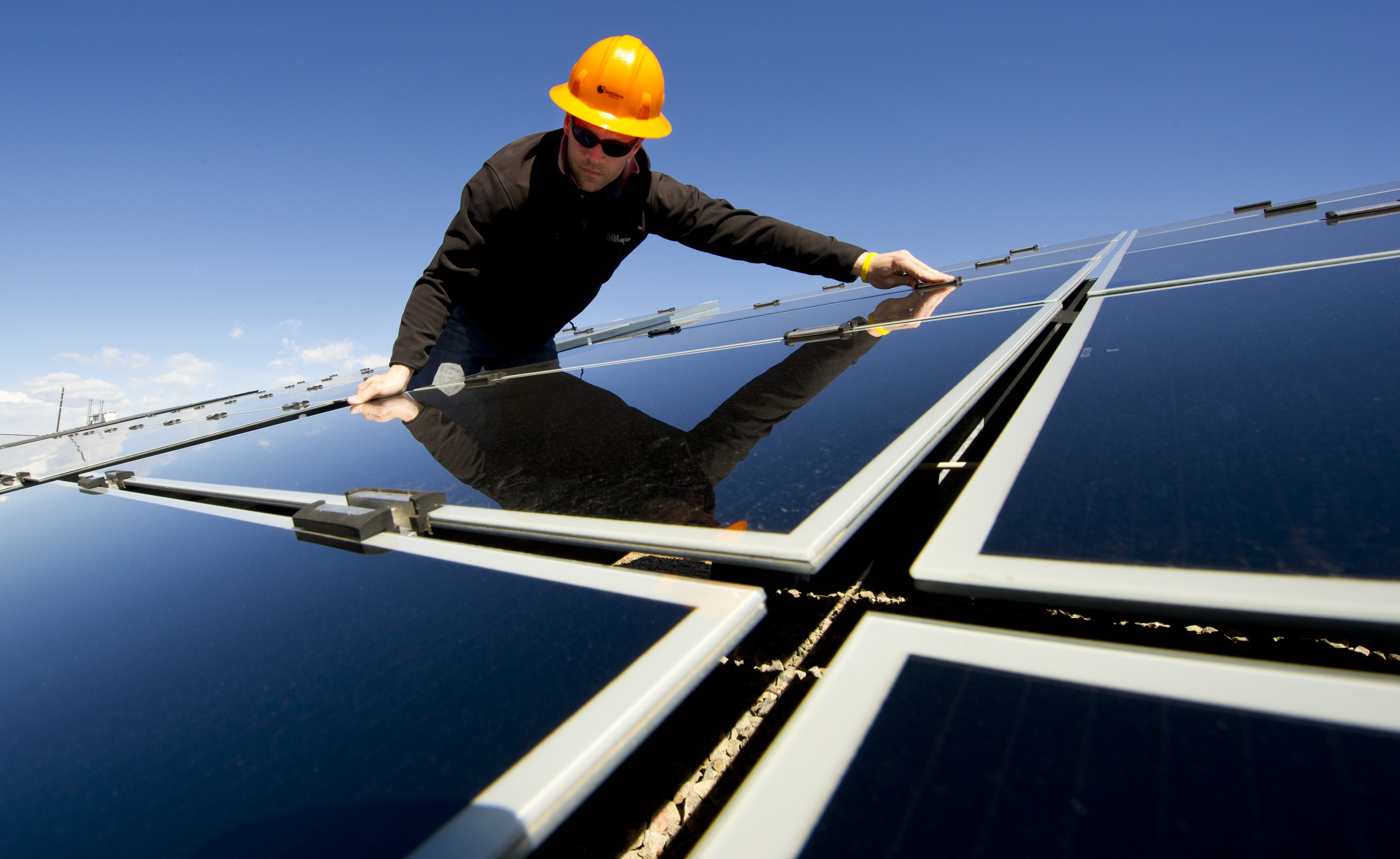
SunEdison Solar Testing Facility

In 2006 MEMC announced its large-scale entry into the burgeoning solar wafer market, via longterm agreements to supply China-based Suntech Power and Taiwan-based Gintech Energy with solar-grade silicon wafers. Similar contracts followed with Germany-based Conergy in 2007, and Taiwan-based Tainergy Tech in 2008. The company cultivated short-term solar wafer customers as well. By 2007, MEMC held approximately 14% of the solar wafer market. Having returned MEMC to a foundation of profitability and having helped it enter the solar market, CEO Nabeel Gareeb resigned in November 2008. Ahmad Chatila was appointed president and CEO in February 2009.

In July 2009 MEMC and Q-Cells, which specialized in construction and operation of photovoltaic plants, formed a joint venture to build Strasskirchen Solar Park, a 50 MW photovoltaic plant in Bavaria, Germany, with MEMC supplying the solar wafers and Q-Cells converting them into solar cells. Both partners invested $100 million each, in return for a 50%-each ownership of the project. As planned, the plant was sold to an investment firm, Nordcapital, after operations started at the beginning of 2010.

=== Acquisition of SunEdison ===
In November 2009 MEMC acquired the privately owned company SunEdison LLC, North America's largest solar energy services provider. Founded by Jigar Shah and Claire Broido Johnson SunEdison had been developing, financing, building, operating, and monitoring large-scale photovoltaic plants for commercial customers, including many national retail outlets, government agencies, and utilities, since 2003. The company had pioneered solar-as-a-service, and the solar power purchase agreement (PPA) for no-money-down customer financing. With the acquisition of SunEdison, MEMC became a developer of solar power projects and North America's largest solar energy services provider. CEO Ahmad Chatila announced that "MEMC will now participate in the actual development of solar power plants and commercialization of clean energy, in addition to supplying the solar and semiconductor industries with our traditional silicon wafer products." SunEdison was purchased for $200 million, 70% in cash and 30% in MEMC stock, plus retention payments, transaction expenses, and the assumption of net debt.

Following its acquisition of SunEdison, MEMC also began to focus on developing and acquiring advanced technologies used in the production of low-cost, high-performance solar panels. It acquired the California-based solar tech company Solaicx in mid 2010. The acquisition included Solaicx's high-volume proprietary "continuous crystal growth" manufacturing technology, which produces low-cost monocrystalline silicon ingots for high-efficiency solar cells.

In February 2011 Samsung Fine Chemicals and MEMC announced a 50/50 joint venture to build a polysilicon production plant in Ulsan, South Korea. The plant was to have an initial capacity of 10,000 metric tons per annum. As of late 2014 the joint venture, called SMP, is 85% owned by SunEdison (50% by SunEdison, Inc. and 35% by SunEdison Semiconductor) and 15% by Samsung, and the plant has a capacity of 13,500 metric tons per annum. By October 2014, the plant began producing the world's first high-pressure fluidized bed reactor (HP-FBR) polysilicon, enabling sizeable reductions in the cost of solar energy.

In 2011 MEMC also extended its solar-energy business. In June 2011, it acquired another North American solar-power project developer, Axio Power. Axio Power, founded in 2007, developed, financed, and constructed large-scale solar projects, and had more than 500 MW of utility-scale photovoltaic power projects in Canada and the western U.S. In July 2011, MEMC established a joint venture with Korea-based Jusung Engineering, to combine its proprietary Solaicx CCZ monocrystalline wafers with Jusung's high-efficiency cell manufacturing equipment to provide low-cost, high-efficiency solar cells. In September 2011, MEMC acquired Fotowatio Renewable Ventures Inc., the U.S. unit of Fotowatio Renewable Ventures, a developer, operator and owner of solar power plants. The FRV purchase added up to 1.4 GW of solar projects in the U.S. to MEMC's portfolio.

In December 2011 MEMC undertook restructuring measures in reaction to a cyclical downturn in its semiconductor business and a slump in the whole supply chain of photovoltaic modules. The company announced a headcount reduction of 1,300 employees (18% of the workforce), plus capacity reduction and productivity increase for polysilicon and wafers.

In 2012 MEMC developed its Silvantis line of multi-crystalline 290-watt solar modules. With 1,000-volt UL certification, the modules created considerable overall energy-production and systems savings on solar projects due to the ability to be more efficiently wired.

=== Name changes and Acquisitions 2013–15 ===
On May 30, 2013, MEMC Electronic Materials changed its name to SunEdison, Inc., and also changed its stock-market ticker from "WFR" to "SUNE", reflecting the company's focus on solar energy. In May 2014, SunEdison formally separated its electronics-wafer business from its solar-wafer and solar-energy business. SunEdison Semiconductor, Ltd. spun off in an IPO on the NASDAQ under the ticker "SEMI", with SunEdison, Inc. maintaining a majority stake as the largest shareholder. The IPO generated $94 million, used to fund the company's growth.

In July 2014, SunEdison created a yieldco subsidiary, called TerraForm Power, Inc., with SunEdison, Inc. maintaining a majority stake as the largest shareholder. TerraForm began publicly trading in an IPO under the ticker "TERP". This IPO of the power-generation subsidiary spin-off raised roughly $500 million. SunEdison launched a second yieldco subsidiary, TerraForm Global, in 2015, to manage renewable-energy projects in emerging markets like Brazil, China, and India. This second yieldco trades on the NASDAQ under the ticker "GLBL".

In October 2014 SunEdison announced the development of "zero white space" solar modules, which eliminate wasted space on the solar module surface. That month it also announced the implementation of "high-pressure fluidized bed reactor" (HP-FBR) technology, producing high-purity polysilicon up to 10 times more efficiently and with 90% less energy used than non-FBR technologies.

In November 2014, with its subsidiary TerraForm Power, SunEdison purchased First Wind, one of the largest wind power developers in the United States, for $2.4 billion. The acquisition added wind energy to SunEdison's capacity, and made it the leading renewable energy development company in the world.

In 2015, MIT Technology Review named SunEdison #6, and the top energy company, in its annual "50 Smartest Companies" list. The review characterized SunEdison as "Aggressively expanding its renewable energy products and building a business to provide electricity to the developing world."

In June 2015, SunEdison, Inc. announced its full divestiture from its semiconductor business, the publicly traded company SunEdison Semiconductor. SunEdison Semiconductors was acquired by GlobalWafers Co., Ltd on December 2, 2016 and subsequently had its name changed back to MEMC LLC. The completion of the sell-off finalized SunEdison's transition into a dedicated renewable-energy company.

=== Bankruptcy ===
Following years of major expansion and the announcement of the intent – which eventually fell through – to acquire the residential-rooftop solar company Vivint Solar in 2015, SunEdison's stock plummeted and its more than $11 billion in debt caused it to face bankruptcy in April 2016. It filed for Chapter 11 bankruptcy protection on April 21, 2016. To continue its operations and pay staff, the company received $300 million in bankruptcy debt financing. It continued operations during bankruptcy. The debt financing money came from first-lien and second-lien lenders. The bankruptcy court approved the money.

When it filed for bankruptcy, the company asked the court for an independent examiner to audit the company's recent financial transactions. SunEdison requested that the examiner's work start immediately and finish within 60 days, and that the maximum budget be $1 million. Reuters noted that, comparatively, the 2015 independent examination in the bankruptcy of Caesars Entertainment Corp. took one year and cost $40 million.

During the summer of 2015, SunEdison was worth almost $10 billion, and in July 2015 shares traded upward of $33.44. On the day of the bankruptcy filing, the company's trading price on the New York Stock Exchange was 34 cents per share.

According to the Wall Street Journal: "SunEdison used a combination of financial engineering and cheap debt to buy up renewable-power projects around the world before the market turned sour last summer and investors soured on its business model." During the three years preceding the bankruptcy filing, SunEdison invested $18 billion in acquisitions. During that time, the company also raised $24 billion in debt and equity.

In March 2016, the U.S. Department of Justice began investigating the company's financial practices. SunEdison's board also conducted an internal investigation, concluding that, while the company's leaders were "overly optimistic", they did not make any "material misstatements" or commit fraud.

In July 2017, the U.S. Bankruptcy Court approved SunEdison's bankruptcy-exit plan and it eventually emerged from bankruptcy December 29, 2017.

Brookfield Asset Management acquired a 51% ownership share of Terraform Power in October 2017 along with full acquisition of Terraform Global in December 2017. Brookfield fully acquired Terraform Power in July 2020.

== SunEdison companies ==
- SunEdison, Inc.

- SunEdison's solar materials group produces granular polysilicon, silicon-crystal ingots, silicon wafers, and specifies the production of solar cells and solar modules. It produces granular polysilicon in purities usable in the solar and semiconductor industries. The granular polysilicon is produced in Pasadena, Texas, and, through a joint venture with Samsung and SunEdison Semiconductor, in Ulsan, Korea.
- SunEdison's solar power group plans, designs, develops, finances, underwrites, builds, installs, operates, monitors, and maintains large-scale solar energy and wind energy systems and plants for commercial customers, including numerous national retail outlets, shopping centers, businesses and corporations; government agencies and other public-sector customers; and utilities and other power companies. Through an extensive dealer network, it also provides complete solar systems and services for residential homeowners.
