= Swinerton =

American construction company

Coordinates: 37.974928°N 122.034063°W

- Company type: 100% Employee-owned
- Industry: General contracting, green building
- Founded: 1888
- Founder: Alfred Bingham Swinerton
- Headquarters: Concord, California
- Key people: Eric Foster, CEO & Chairman
- Number of employees: 4,672
- Website: www.swinerton.com

Swinerton (/ˈswɪnərtən/ SWIHN-ur-tən) is a commercial construction company that provides services in the United States for commercial office, retail, multi-family residential, hospitality, healthcare, education, energy, and the entertainment sectors. The company also provides preconstruction services, including budgeting, scheduling, value management, and planning. Headquartered in San Francisco, California, Swinerton was founded in 1888 and holds California Contractors License No. 92. It has offices located throughout California, as well as offices in Atlanta, Charlotte, Austin, Denver, Portland, Seattle, Honolulu, and more.

== History ==
Swinerton Incorporated was founded in 1888 by Charles Lindgren. In the late 1800s, Lindgren partnered with Lewis Hicks, a civil engineer who pioneered the innovation of steel-reinforced concrete in buildings. During the construction of the Fairmont Hotel in San Francisco the Great Earthquake & Fire of 1906 occurred and one of the few buildings to survive was the Fairmont Hotel.

In 1908, Charles Lindgren and his brother Fred formed the Lindgren Company. The Swinerton name would eventually come in after estimator Alfred Bingham Swinerton joined the team and helped grow the company significantly.

Swinerton also built San Francisco's Ghirardelli Square, as well as one of the first green buildings in the nation, the Weyerhaeuser Headquarters in Federal Way, Washington. Swinerton also develops and has constructed high-rise offices including the San Francisco Centre, Levi's Plaza and the Gap Worldwide Headquarters.

Swinerton Renewable Energy was formed on 2008. In its first ten years, it built over 3.5 GW of projects.

== Notable buildings and projects ==
- Fairmont Hotel
- Ghirardelli Square
- Weyerhauser Headquarters
- San Francisco Centre
- Levi's Plaza
- Gap Worldwide Headquarters
- Eel River Bridge
- Coca-Cola Bottling Plant in Oakland, California
- Chrysler Assembly Plant in San Leandro, California
- Western Sugar Refinery
- Northlake Commons (Mass Timber), Seattle, WA
- NASA Sustainability Base
- Chevron Midland Campus, Midland, Texas
- Gateway Hall and restoration of Camarillo State Hospital buildings at California State University Channel Islands
