= Yield co =

Company formed to own operating assets and distribute stable cash flows to investors

A yield co or yieldco is a company that is formed to own operating assets that produce a predictable cash flow, primarily through long term contracts. Separating volatile activities (such as development, R&D, construction) from stable activities of operating assets can lower the cost of capital. Yield cos are expected to pay a major portion of their earnings in dividends, which may be a valuable source of funding for parent companies which own a sizeable stake.

Yield cos are commonly used in the energy industry, particularly in renewable energy to protect investors against regulatory changes. They serve the same purpose as master limited partnerships (MLPs) and real estate investment trusts (REITs), which most utilities can't form due to regulatory constraints. Yield cos give investors a chance to participate in renewable energy without many of the risks associated with it.

The number of yield cos grew rapidly in 2013 and 2014 through initial public offerings. They include:

- NextEra Energy Partners
- NRG Yield
- Brookfield Renewable Energy Partners
- TransAlta Renewables
- Pattern Energy Group
- Atlantica Yield PLC
- Hannon Armstrong Sustainable Infrastructure
- TerraForm Power
- TerraForm Global
- 8point3 Energy Partners.
- Saeta Yield

There is also an ETF (Exchange Traded Fund) that was set up by Global X Funds under the ticker Symbol YLCO, which seeks investment results that correspond generally to the price and yield performance, of the Indxx Global YieldCo Index. In February 2021, the Global X YieldCo & Renewable Energy Income ETF (YLCO) changed its name to the Global X Renewable Energy Producers ETF and its index from the Indxx YieldCo & Renewable Energy Income Index to the Indxx Renewable Energy Producers Index. Its ticker changed from YLCO to RNRG.

== Benefits for parent companies ==
Deutsche Bank mentioned several benefits of creating yield cos for their parent companies:

Deutsche Bank, Crossing the Chasm (February 2015) —

1. YieldCos enable investors to better value the company's ability to grow assets and assign a multiple on cashflows.
2. By creating a YieldCo, solar companies have the option to create an IDR structure and potentially benefit from growth of the YieldCo in the longer term. Solar companies were previously not able to benefit from this strategy by simply selling projects to a YieldCo.
3. More revenue streams can be dropped down into the YieldCos especially as assets continue to grow. One specific example is inclusion of O&M revenues from installed base of operating assets.
4. YieldCos expand the investor base and contribute to valuation multiple expansion. Several energy/MLP/utility investors are looking to invest in solar companies that have announced plans to form a YieldCo.
