= First Wind =

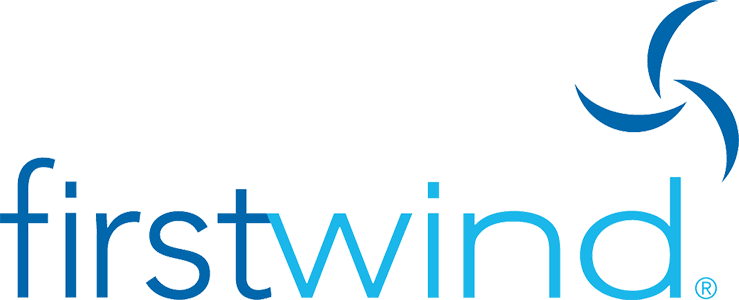
- Headquarters: Boston, Massachusetts, United States of America

First Wind was an independent renewable energy company. It developed and operated utility-scale power projects in the United States. At its height, First Wind employed more than 220 workers.

Headquartered in Boston, the company developed and operated renewable energy projects in Maine, Vermont, Massachusetts, New York, Utah, Idaho, Washington and Hawaii with a combined capacity of nearly 1,300 megawatts. In addition to renewable energy projects, the company developed and operates two generator leads.

== History ==
The company was founded in 2002.

First Wind began as a utility-scale wind power developer and operator, but in 2014 the company brought its first solar energy projects online.

In November 2014 First Wind was purchased by SunEdison and its yieldco TerraForm Power for $2.4 billion.

In February 2015, as part of the merger integration, First Wind CEO, Paul Gaynor, who had led the company since 2004, was appointed EVP Of North America Utility And Global Wind at SunEdison.
