= PacifiCorp =

Electric power company serving the Western United States

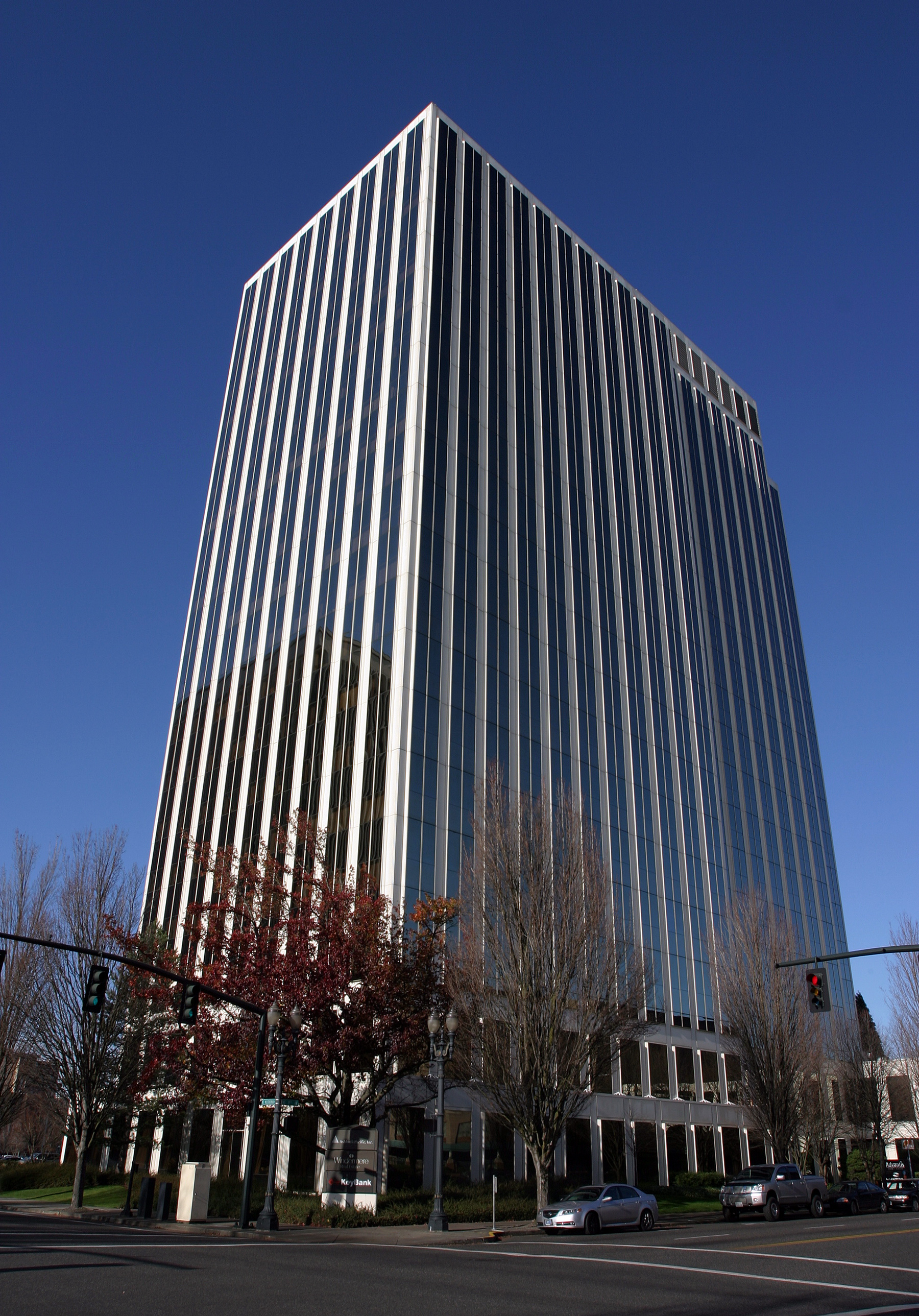
- Headquarters in Portland, Oregon
- Type: Subsidiary
- Industry: Electric power industry
- Founded: 1910; 116 years ago
- Headquarters: Lloyd Center Tower; Portland, Oregon, U.S.
- Area served: California; Idaho; Oregon; Utah; Washington; Wyoming
- Key people: Cindy Crane (Chair and CEO, PacifiCorp); Ryan Flynn (President, Pacific Power Division); Richard Garlish (President, Rocky Mountain Power Division)
- Number of employees: 5,200
- Parent: Berkshire Hathaway Energy
- Divisions: Pacific Power; Rocky Mountain Power
- Website: pacificorp.com

PacifiCorp is an electric power company based in the Lloyd Center Tower in Portland, Oregon with operations in the western United States.

PacifiCorp has two business units: Pacific Power, a regulated electric utility with service territory throughout Oregon, northern California, and southeastern Washington headquartered in Portland, Oregon; and Rocky Mountain Power, a regulated electric utility with service territory throughout Utah, Wyoming, and southeastern Idaho, headquartered in Salt Lake City, Utah. PacifiCorp operates one of the largest privately held transmission systems in the U.S. within the western Energy Imbalance Market.

Pacific Power and Rocky Mountain Power combined serve over 1.6 million residential customers, 202,000 commercial customers, and 37,000 industrial and irrigation customers, for a total of approximately 1,813,000 customers. The service area is 143,000 square miles (370,000 km^{2}). The company owns and maintains 16,500 miles (26,600 km) of long-distance transmission lines, 64,000 miles (103,000 km) of distribution lines, and 900 substations.

PacifiCorp owns, maintains and operates generation assets and manages the commercial and trading operations of the company. PacifiCorp owns 68 generating plants with a capacity of 9,140 megawatts. 70.6% of the generation is from thermal sources (i.e., coal or natural gas), 6.7% from hydroelectric sources, and 0.2% from renewable sources. 22.5% of PacifiCorp's generation is purchased from other suppliers or under contracts.

The company is planning on keeping only 3 of its 22 coal-fired power stations operational beyond 2040 and is planning to source 56% of its yearly consumption with renewable energy by 2040.

== History ==
Pacific Power & Light was formed in 1910 from the merger of several financially troubled utilities in Oregon and Washington to form the Pacific Power & Light Company. It gradually expanded its reach to include most of Oregon, as well as portions of California, Washington and Wyoming. In 1984, it reorganized itself as a holding company, PacifiCorp, headquartered in Portland with Pacific Power as its main subsidiary.

Utah Power and Light (UP&L) was organized on 6 September 1912 from the merger of four electric companies in Utah, Idaho and Wyoming and was a Salt Lake City subsidiary of a large holding company, Electric Bond and Share Company (EBASCO) of New York. Within four years of its organization, UP&L had purchased twenty-seven other electric companies in the general Utah area, and eventually absorbed more than one hundred thirty. In 1881, one of those companies had made Salt Lake City the fifth city in the world with central station electricity.

In 1954, Pacific Power & Light merged with the Mountain States Power Company, essentially doubling the company's service area. In 1961, the company purchased the California Oregon Power Company, extending its service into southern Oregon and northern California.

In 1977, PacifiCorp spun off its coal mining interests into a mining company known as NERCO, which was eventually listed on the New York Stock Exchange and ranked as high as 353 on the Fortune 500 list of the largest American companies. Through its majority interest in NERCO, PacifiCorp was involved in the mining of coal, oil, natural gas, gold, silver, and uranium. PacifiCorp still owned 82% of NERCO in 1993, when it was acquired by the mining giant Rio Tinto Group.

In August 1987, PacifiCorp agreed to acquire Utah Power & Light. The merger was completed in January 1989.

In 2001, PacifiCorp was acquired by Scottish Power.

In 2006, PacifiCorp was acquired by Berkshire Hathaway Energy, formerly known as MidAmerican Energy Holdings, a division of Berkshire Hathaway, for $5.1 billion in cash.

In a July 2006 reorganization, Pacific Power's territory in central and eastern Wyoming was merged with the Utah Power territory to form Rocky Mountain Power.

=== Generation resources ===
In these tables of generation properties owned or partially owned by PacifiCorp, total capacity is 10,556 MW. Of this, 56% is coal, 24% is natural gas, 10% is hydroelectric, and 10% is renewable.

Major generation facilities include:

==== Thermal generation (Fossil fueled) ====
Plant Name	Location	Fuel	Net Capacity (MW)	Online Date
Jim Bridger (Two-thirds owner)	Point of Rocks, WY	Coal	1,413.4	
Hunter	Castle Dale, Utah	Coal	1,112.4	1977
Huntington	Huntington, Utah	Coal	895.0	1973
Dave Johnston	Glenrock, Wyoming	Coal	762.0	
Naughton	Kemmerer, Wyoming	Coal	357.0	
Naughton	Kemmerer, Wyoming	Natural Gas	247.0	
Lake Side	Vineyard, Utah	Natural Gas	1,203.0	2007/2014
Currant Creek	Mona, Utah	Natural Gas	540.0	
Hermiston	Hermiston, Oregon	Natural Gas	540.0	
Chehalis	Chehalis, Washington	Natural Gas	540.0	
Cholla	Joseph City, Arizona	Coal	0	retired
Gadsby	Salt Lake City, Utah	Natural Gas	355.0	
Wyodak	Wyoming	Coal	268.0	
Craig (partial owner)	Craig, Colorado	Coal	165.0	
Colstrip (partial owner)	Colstrip, Montana	Coal	148.0	
Hayden (partial owner)	Colorado	Coal	78.1	
Total Coal			5,579	
Total Gas			3,265	
TOTAL			8,844	

==== Hydroelectric generation ====
Name	Net Capacity (MW)
Lewis River	578.2
North Umpqua Hydroelectric Project	199.9
Bear River	103.9
Prospect (Rogue River)	36.0
(30 minor projects)	78.3
TOTAL	996.2

==== Renewable generation ====
Name	Type	Net Capacity (MW)
Leaning Juniper I	Wind	100.5
Wolverine Creek	Wind	64.5
Rock River I	Wind	50.0
Combine Hills	Wind	41.0
Foote Creek	Wind	41.1
Blundell	Geothermal	33.0
Goodnoe Hills	Wind	94
Marengo I	Wind	156
Marengo II	Wind	78
Glenrock	Wind	138
Seven Mile Hill	Wind	99
Seven Mile Hill II	Wind	19.5
Rolling Hills	Wind	99
Glenrock III	Wind	39
High Plains	Wind	99
McFadden Ridge	Wind	28.8
Dunlap	Wind	111
Black Cap	Solar	2
Cedar Springs II	Wind	200
Ekola Flats	Wind	250.9
TB Flats I	Wind	250
TB Flats II	Wind	250
Total Wind		2,209.6
Total Solar		2
Total Geothermal		33
TOTAL Renewable		2,244.6

=== Coal mining ===
PacifiCorp also owns and operates several captive coal mines located at or very near some of its generation plants. In Wyoming, PacifiCorp operates and has partial interest in Jim Bridger Mine and owns the Dave Johnston Mine, which is in final reclamation. The company also owned and operated the Deer Creek Mine in Utah, near the Huntington Plant but closed it in 2015 and has a partial interest in the Trapper Mine in Colorado.

=== Electric vehicles ===
Calling it a "new era of utility involvement in transportation electrification," the Portland Business Journal in 2018 described PacifiCorp's electric vehicle promotion program as a plan that promises new electric vehicle charging sites, outreach and education efforts. The program was spawn from legislation passed in 2016 that called for more renewable energy from the state's utility companies.

=== Customers ===
As of May 1, 2007, Rocky Mountain Power serves approximately 758,000 customers in Utah, 129,000 customers in Idaho, and 67,000 customers in Wyoming.

=== Net metering ===
In November 2017, Rocky Mountain Power made a deal with Utah's utility authorities to phase out net metering. The program was paying customers who generated their own electricity with rooftop solar panels the residential rate for their excess energy that got sent back into the energy grid. As of August 2018, new rooftop solar installations were down 23 percent, likely due to the cancellation of the net metering program. New solar customers are paid by a transitional program that pays slightly less than the residential rate until 2033. People who installed solar panels prior to November 2017 are grandfathered at the previous rates until 2035.

=== Pacific Power ===
Pacific Power serves customers in Washington, Oregon and California. Major cities served include:

- California
  - Crescent City
  - Dunsmuir
  - Mount Shasta
  - Yreka
- Oregon
  - Albany
  - Astoria
  - Bend
  - Coos Bay
  - Corvallis
  - Dallas
  - Grants Pass
  - Hermiston
  - Hood River
  - Independence
  - Junction City
  - Klamath Falls
  - Lebanon
  - Lincoln City
  - Medford
  - North Bend
  - Pendleton
  - Portland (parts of downtown, northern and eastern Portland; the rest of city is served by Portland General Electric.)
  - Prineville
  - Redmond
  - Roseburg
  - Stayton
  - Sweet Home
- Washington
  - Walla Walla
  - Yakima

As of December 31, 2009, Pacific Power serves 555,070 customers in Oregon, 126,665 customers in Washington, and 45,148 customers in California.

=== Rocky Mountain Power ===
Rocky Mountain Power serves customers in Idaho, Utah, and Wyoming.

Major cities served include:

==== Idaho ====
Ammon, Lava Hot Springs, Malad City, Montpelier, Preston, Rigby, Rexburg, Saint Anthony, Shelley

==== Utah ====
Rocky Mountain Power serves most of Utah with the following exceptions:

Beaver City, Blanding, Bountiful, Brigham City, Duchesne, City of Enterprise, Ephraim, Fairview, Fillmore, Heber, Helper, Holden, Hurricane, Hyrum, Kanosh, Kaysville, Lehi, Logan, Meadow Town, Monroe, Morgan, Mt. Pleasant, Murray, Oak City, Paragonah, Parowan, Payson, Price City, Roosevelt, Santa Clara, Spring City, Springville, St. George, Ticaboo, and Washington City.

==== Wyoming ====
Buffalo, Casper, Cody, Douglas, Evanston, Green River, Kemmerer, Lander, Laramie, Rawlins, Riverton, Rock Springs, Thermopolis

== Legal issues ==
In 2023, a jury ordered PacifiCorp to pay $70 million in punitive damages to 17 homeowners negatively impacted by the 2020 Oregon wildfires. In August 2024, PacifiCorp revealed that it faced at least $46 billion in claims resulting from four separate class action complaints related to the wildfires.
