= Index of Utah-related articles =

The location of the state of Utah in the United States of America

The following is an alphabetical list of articles related to the U.S. state of Utah.

== 0–9 ==
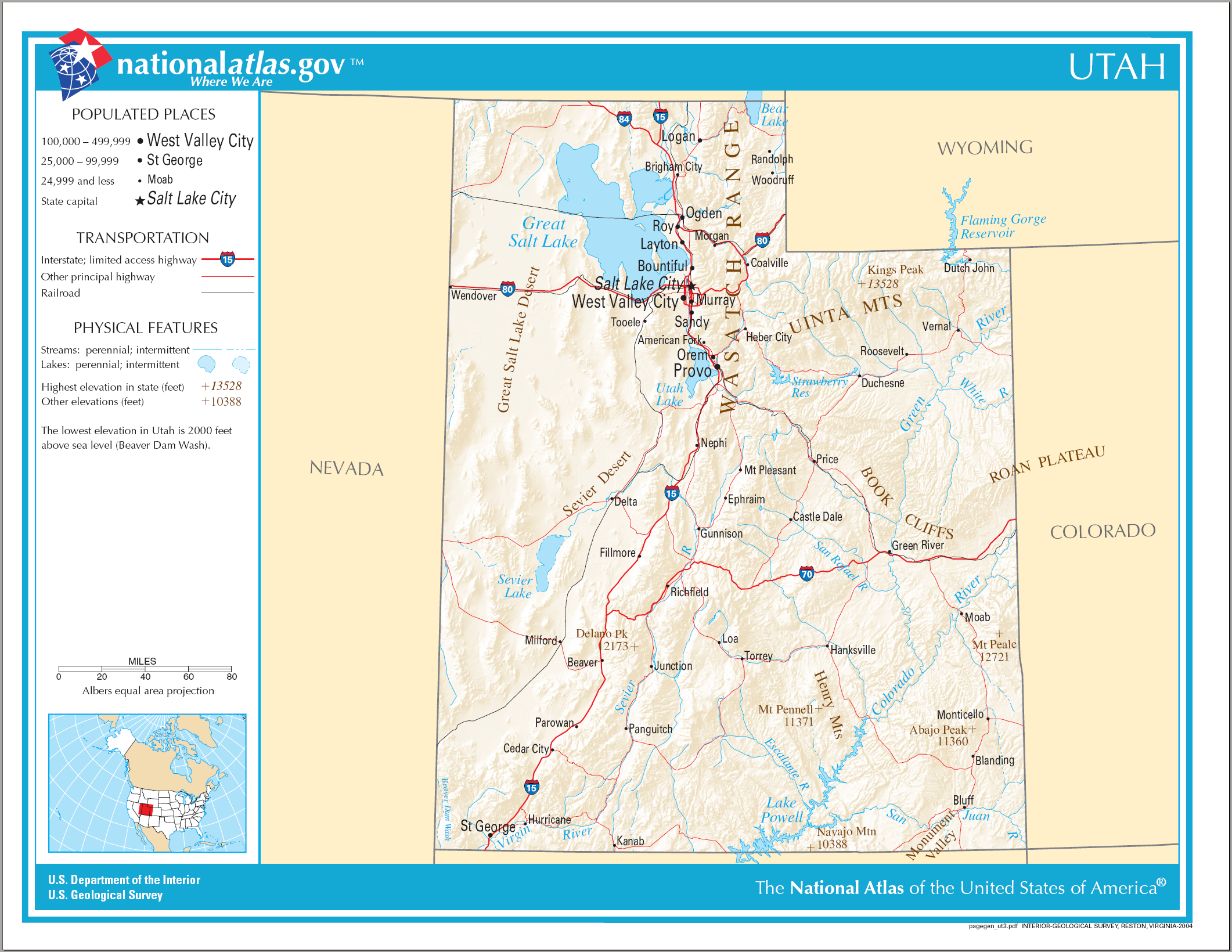
An enlargeable map of the state of Utah

- .ut.us – Internet second-level domain for the state of Utah
- 4 Corners
  - 4 Corners Monument
- XIX Olympic Winter Games
- 32nd meridian west from Washington
- 34th meridian west from Washington
- 37th meridian west from Washington
- 37th parallel north
- 38th parallel north
- 39th parallel north
- 40th parallel north
- 41st parallel north
- 42nd parallel north
- 110th meridian west
- 111th meridian west
- 112th meridian west
- 113th meridian west
- 114th meridian west
- 2003 Utah snowstorm

== A ==
- Adjacent states:
  - State of Arizona
  - State of Colorado
  - State of Idaho
  - State of Nevada
  - State of New Mexico
  - State of Wyoming
- Agriculture in Utah
- Airports in Utah
- Allium cepa
- Allosaurus
- Alpha Ursae Majoris
- Amusement parks in Utah
- Apis mellifera
- Arboreta in Utah
  - commons:Category:Arboreta in Utah
- Archaeology of Utah
  - Category:Archaeological sites in Utah
    - commons:Category:Archaeological sites in Utah
- Architecture in Utah
- Arches National Park
- Art museums and galleries in Utah
  - commons:Category:Art museums and galleries in Utah
- Artists in Utah
- Ashley National Forest

== B ==
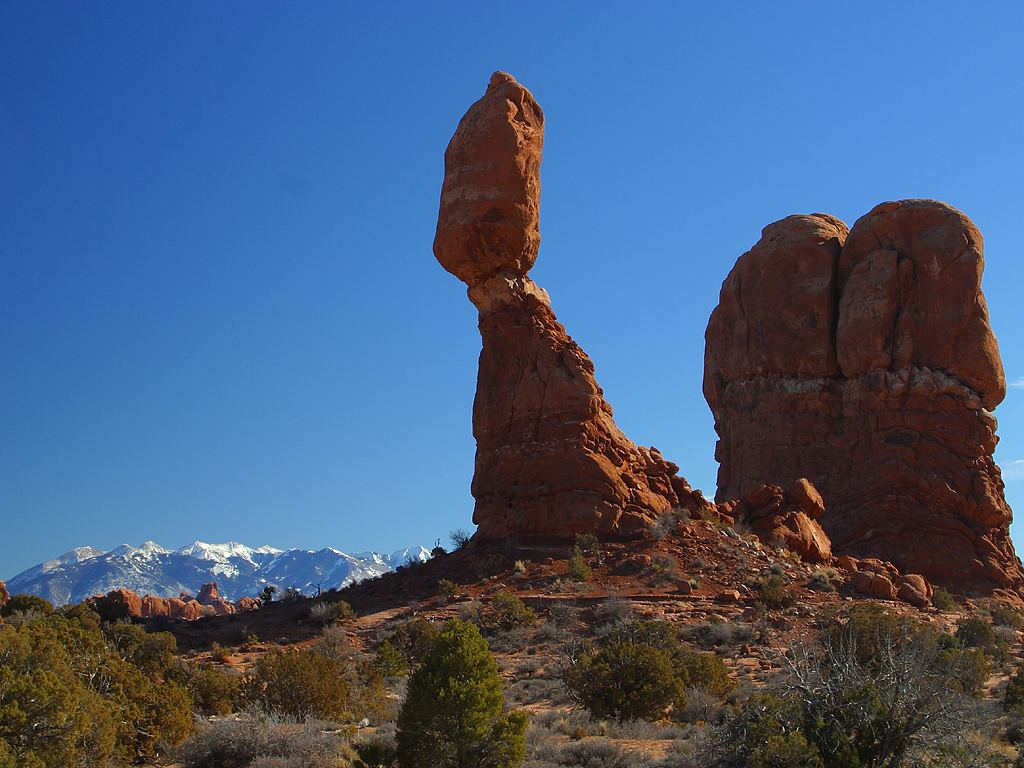
Balanced Rock in Arches National Park

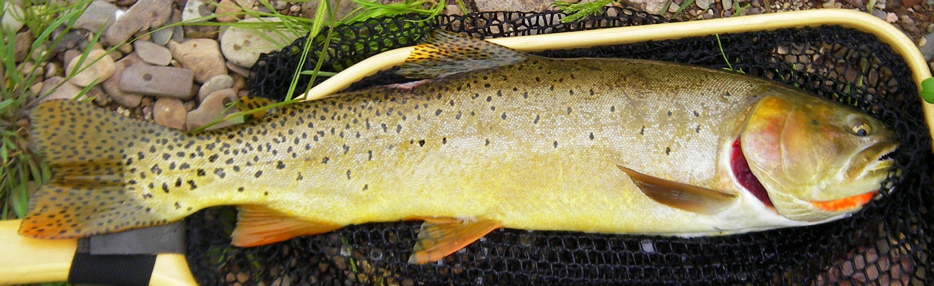
Native Utah Bonneville cutthroat trout

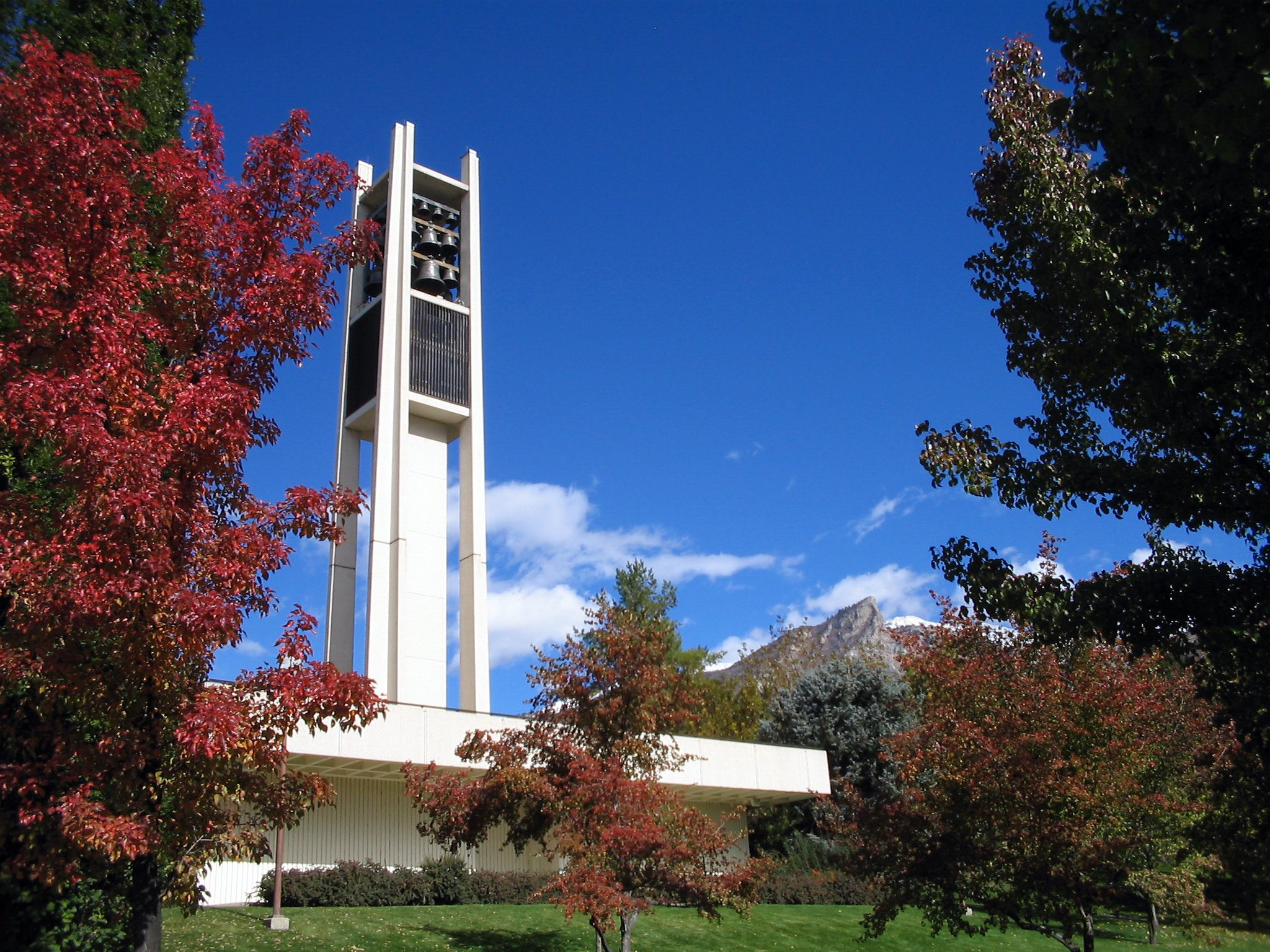
Brigham Young University

- Balanced Rock
- Bear Lake
- Bear River Migratory Bird Refuge
- Beehive
- Beehive Cluster
- Benjamin Louis Eulalie de Bonneville
- Bike paths in Utah
- Bonneville, Benjamin Louis Eulalie de
- Bonneville cutthroat trout
- Botanical gardens in Utah
  - commons:Category:Botanical gardens in Utah
- Bridger, Jim
- Bridges in Utah
  - Bridges on the National Register of Historic Places in Utah
- Brigham Young
- Brigham Young University
  - Brigham Young University graduates
- Bryce Canyon National Park
- Buildings and structures in Utah
  - commons:Category:Buildings and structures in Utah

== C ==
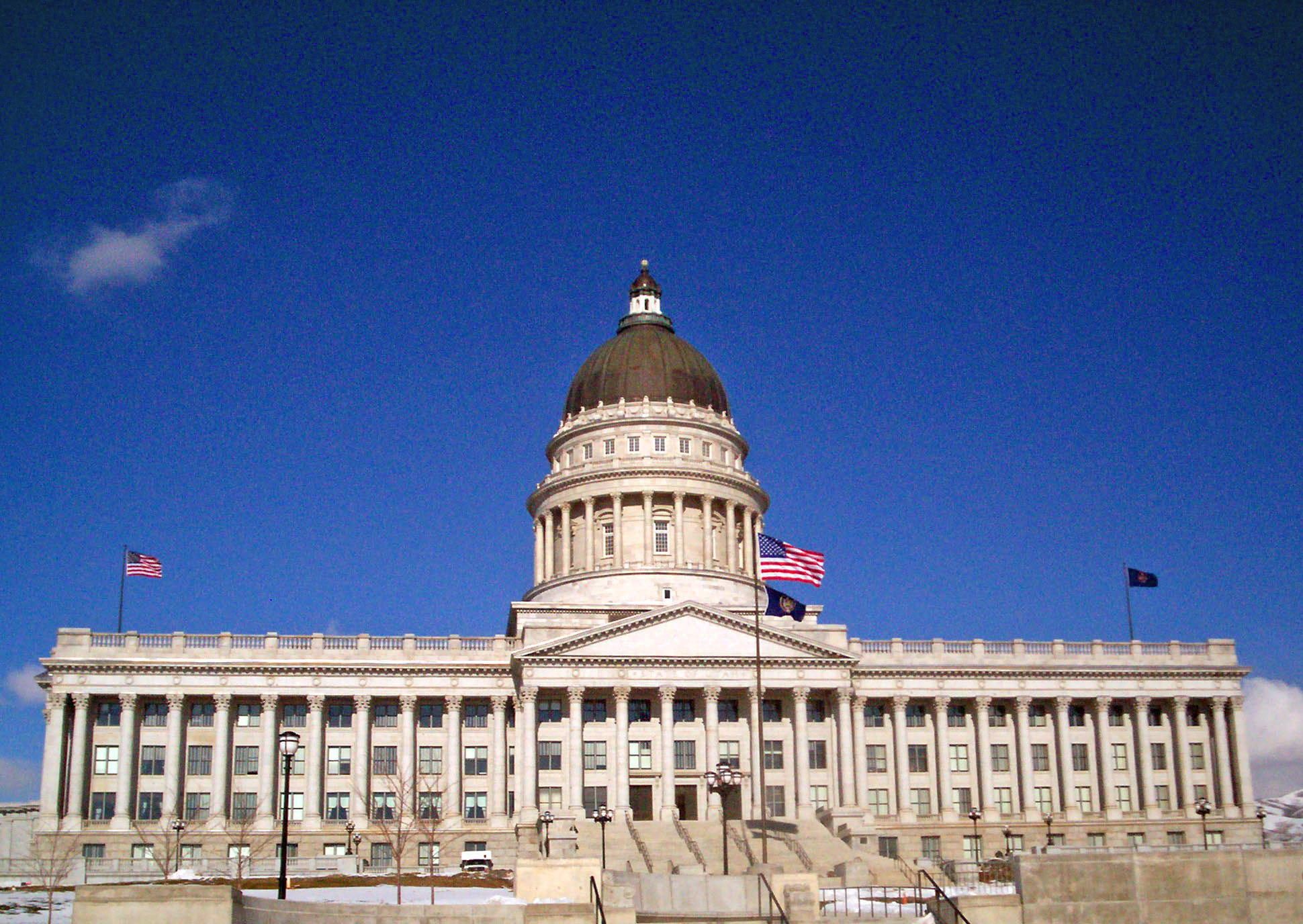
The Utah State Capitol in Salt Lake City

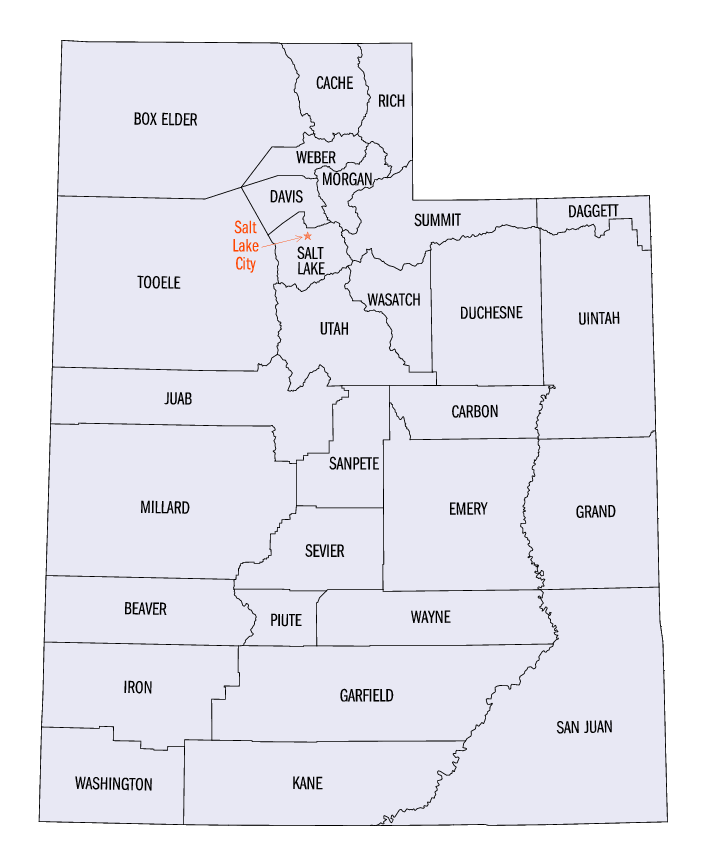
An enlargeable map of the 29 counties of the State of Utah

- Calochortus nuttallii
- Canyon Lands
- Canyonlands National Park
- Canyons and gorges of Utah
  - commons:Category:Canyons and gorges of Utah
- Capital punishment in Utah
- Capitol of the State of Utah
- Capitol Reef National Park
- Catholic Community Services of Utah
- Caribou-Targhee National Forest
- Cedar Breaks National Monument
- Census Designated Places in Utah
- Census statistical areas in Utah
- Cervus canadensis nelsoni
- Cherry
- Children's Service Society
- Church of Jesus Christ of Latter-day Saints
- Cities in Utah
- Civil Rights in Utah
- Climate of Utah
  - Category:Climate of Utah
    - commons:Category:Climate of Utah
- Colleges and universities in Utah
- Colorado Plateau
- Colorado River
- Committees of the 57th Utah State Legislature
- Communications in Utah
  - commons:Category:Communications in Utah
- Companies based in Utah
- Community Action Services and Food Bank
- Constitution of the State of Utah
- Convention centers in Utah
  - commons:Category:Convention centers in Utah
- Copper
- Counties in Utah
  - County seats in Utah
- Crime in Utah
- Cuisine of Utah
  - commons:Category:Utah cuisine
- Culture of Utah
  - commons:Category:Utah culture

== D ==
- Demographics of Utah
- Deseret (disambiguation)
  - State of Deseret
- Dinosaur National Monument
- Diversity organizations in Utah
- Dixie (Utah)
- Dixie National Forest
- Dominguez-Escalante Expedition, 1776
- Drainage basins in Utah
- Dubhe
- Dutch oven

== E ==
- Economy of Utah
  - Category:Economy of Utah
    - commons:Category:Economy of Utah
- Education in Utah
  - Category:Education in Utah
    - commons:Category:Education in Utah
- Elections in Utah
  - commons:Category:Elections in Utah
- Environment of Utah
  - commons:Category:Environment of Utah

== F ==
The Flag of the State of Utah

- Festivals in Utah
  - commons:Category:Festivals in Utah
- Fillmore, Utah, territorial capital 1850-1858
- Films set in Utah
- Films shot in Utah
- Fishlake National Forest
- Five Mile Pass
- Flag of the State of Utah
- Flora of Utah
- Forts in Utah
  - Category:Forts in Utah
    - commons:Category:Forts in Utah
- Four Corners
  - Four Corners Monument

== G ==
The Great Seal of the State of Utah

- Geography of Utah
  - Category:Geography of Utah
    - commons:Category:Geography of Utah
- Geology of Utah
  - commons:Category:Geology of Utah
- Geysers of Utah
  - commons:Category:Geysers of Utah
- Ghost towns in Utah
  - Category:Ghost towns in Utah
    - commons:Category:Ghost towns in Utah
- Glen Canyon National Recreation Area
- Government of the State of Utah website
  - Category:Government of Utah
    - commons:Category:Government of Utah
- Governor of the State of Utah website
  - List of governors of Utah
- Grand Staircase–Escalante National Monument
- Great Basin
- Great Salt Lake
- Great Salt Lake Desert
- Great Seal of the State of Utah
- Green River

== H ==
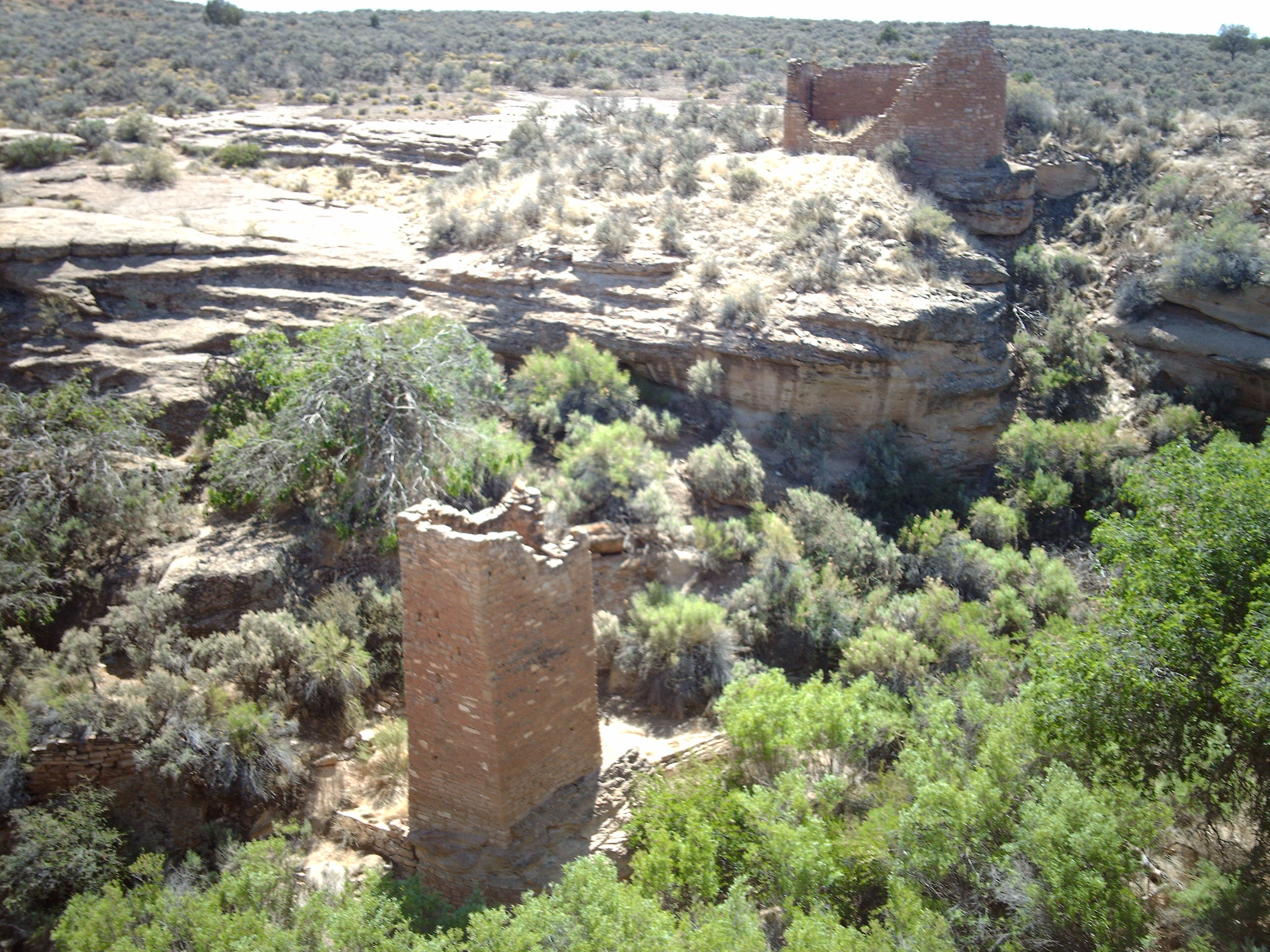
The Square Tower in Hovenweep National Monument

- Heritage railroads in Utah
  - commons:Category:Heritage railroads in Utah
- High schools in Utah
- Highway Patrol of Utah
- Highways (state) in Utah
  - Minor state highways in Utah
- Hiking trails in Utah
  - commons:Category:Hiking trails in Utah
- History of Utah
  - Historical outline of Utah
    - Category:History of Utah
      - commons:Category:History of Utah
- Hospitals in Utah
- Hot springs of Utah
  - commons:Category:Hot springs of Utah
- Hovenweep National Monument

== I ==
- Images of Utah
  - commons:Category:Utah
- Indian Creek Wilderness Study Area
- Indian ricegrass
- Interstate Highways in Utah
- Islands in Utah

== J ==
- Jell-O
- Jim Bridger

== K ==
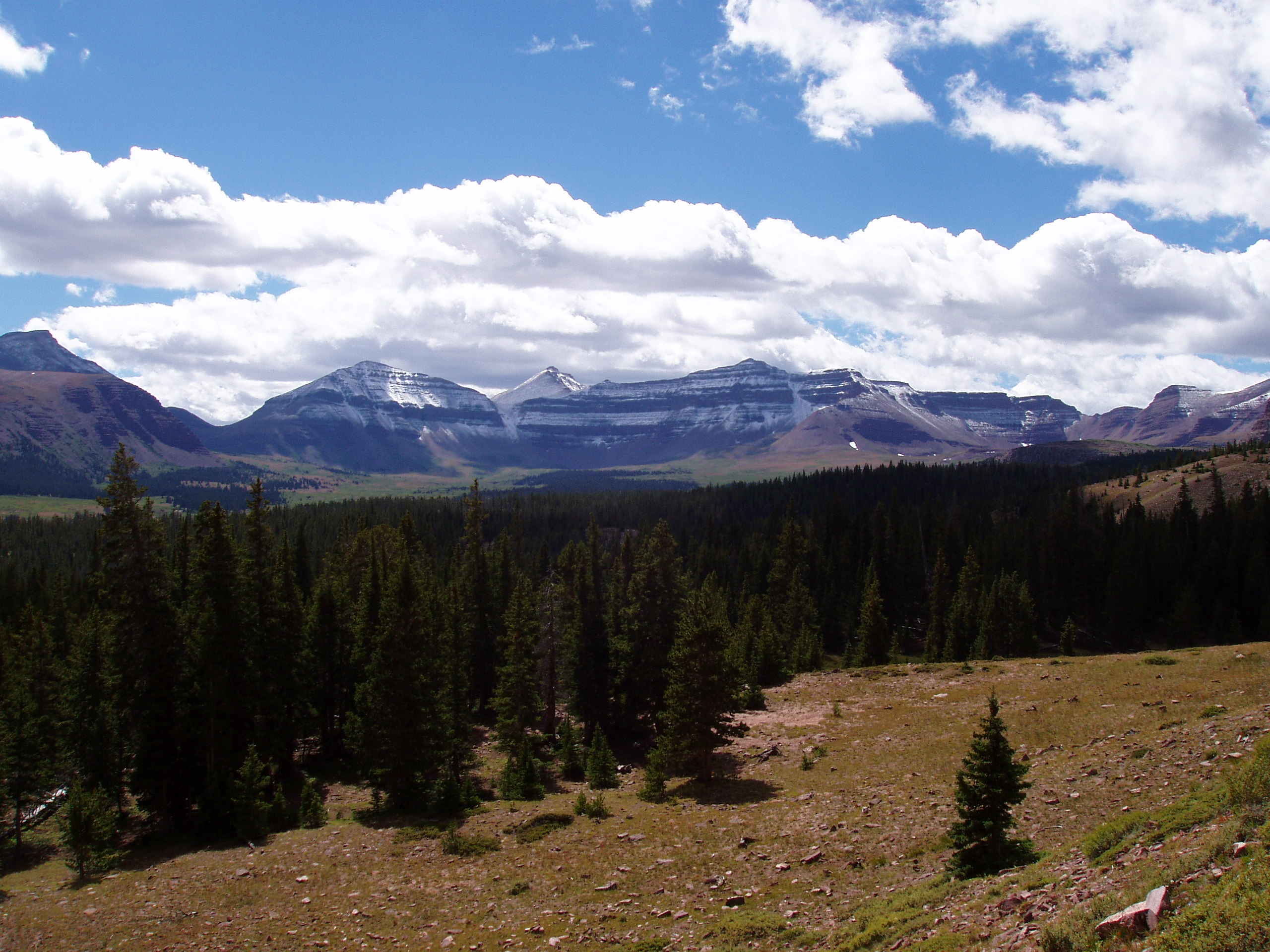
Kings Peak, the highest point in the State of Utah

- Kings Peak

== L ==
- Lake Bonneville
- Lakes of Utah
  - Bear Lake
  - Great Salt Lake
  - Lake Powell
  - Utah Lake
  - commons:Category:Lakes of Utah
- Landforms of Utah
- Landmarks in Utah
  - commons:Category:Landmarks in Utah
- Larus californicus
- Latter-day Saints, The Church of Jesus Christ of
  - Latter-day Saints topics
- Legislature of the State of Utah (website)
  - List of Utah legislatures
- Lieutenant Governor of the State of Utah (website)
  - List of lieutenant governors of Utah
- Lists related to the State of Utah:
  - List of airports in Utah
  - List of bridges on the National Register of Historic Places in Utah
  - List of artists in Utah
  - List of birds of Utah
  - List of bouldering sites in Utah
  - List of Brigham Young University people
  - List of canyons and gorges in Utah
  - List of census statistical areas in Utah
  - List of colleges and universities in Utah
  - List of committees of the 57th Utah State Legislature
  - List of counties in Utah
  - List of dams and reservoirs in Utah
  - List of forts in Utah
  - List of ghost towns in Utah
  - List of governors of Utah
  - List of high schools in Utah
  - List of state highways in Utah
  - List of state highways serving Utah state parks and institutions
  - List of hospitals in Utah
  - List of individuals executed in Utah since 1976
  - List of Interstate Highways in Utah
  - List of islands in Utah
  - List of lakes of Utah
  - List of lieutenant governors of Utah
  - List of mayors of Salt Lake City
  - List of military installations in Utah
  - List of minor state highway routes in Utah
  - List of mountain ranges of Utah
  - List of municipalities in Utah
  - List of musical groups in Utah
  - List of named highway junctions in Utah
  - List of National Scenic Byways in Utah
  - List of newspapers in Utah
  - List of people from Utah
  - List of plateaus and mesas of Utah
  - List of power stations in Utah
  - List of professional sports teams in Utah
  - List of radio stations in Utah
  - List of railroads in Utah
  - List of Registered Historic Places in Utah
  - List of rivers of Utah
  - List of Salt Lake City media
  - List of scenic byways designated by the State of Utah
  - List of school districts in Utah
  - List of state highways in Utah
  - List of U.S. Highways in Utah
  - List of state legislatures of Utah
  - List of state parks of Utah
  - List of state prisons of Utah
  - List of television stations in Utah
  - List of topics about the Latter Day Saint movement
  - List of Utah's congressional delegations
  - List of United States congressional districts in Utah
  - List of United States representatives from Utah
  - List of United States senators from Utah
  - List of University of Utah people
  - List of Utah state symbols
  - List of Utah State University people
  - List of valleys of Utah
  - List of Wikipedia categories related to Utah
  - List of writers from Utah

== M ==
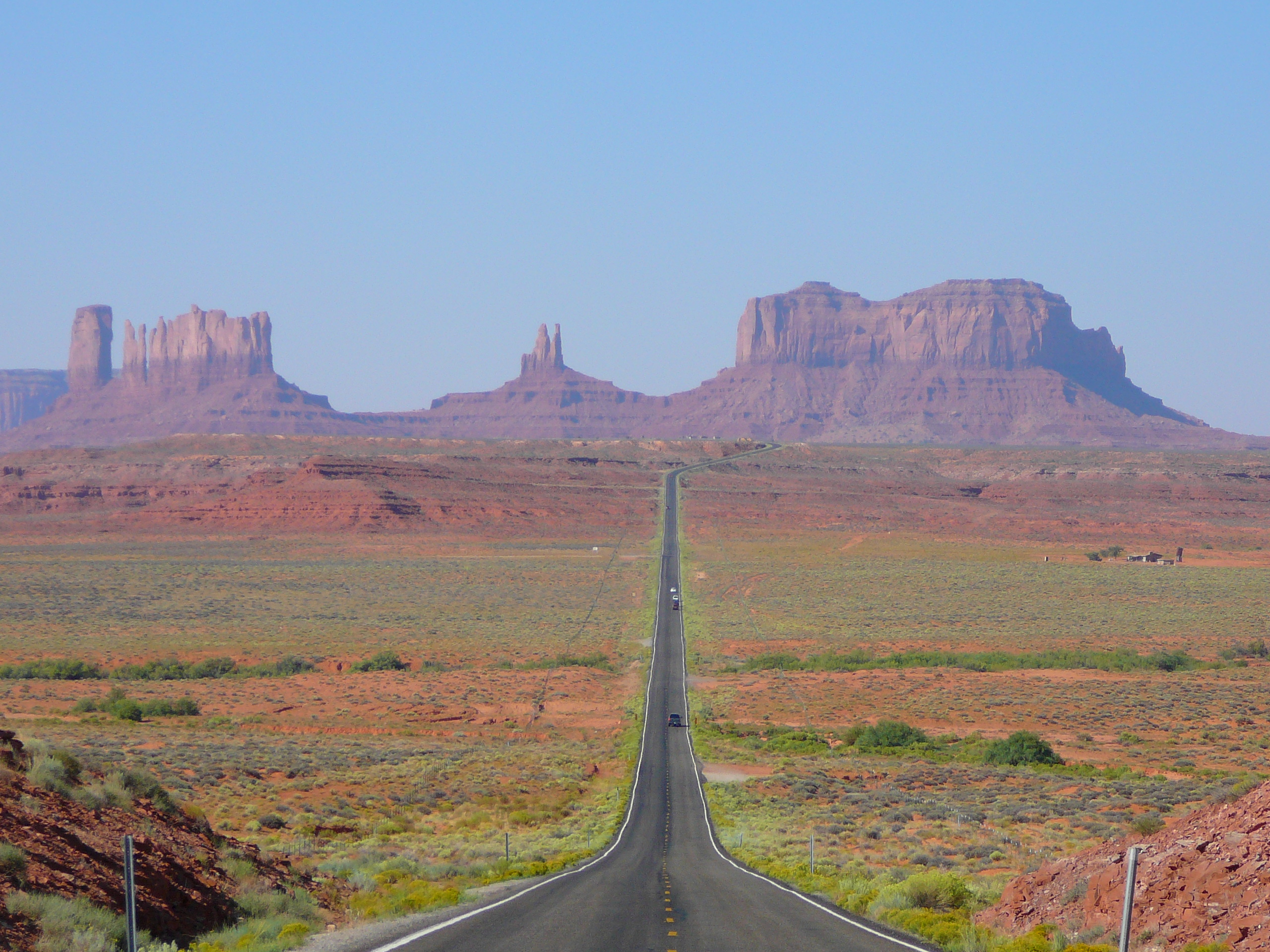
Monument Valley in southeastern Utah

- Madrean Region
- Malad River (Idaho-Utah)
- Manti-La Sal National Forest
- Maps of Utah
  - commons:Category:Maps of Utah
- McInnis Canyons National Conservation Area
- Metaphor: The Tree of Utah
- Metropolitan areas in Utah
- Micropolitan statistical areas of Utah
- Minor state highway routes in Utah
- Moab, Utah
- Moab 240
- Moab Jeep Safari
- Monument Valley
- Monuments and memorials in Utah
  - commons:Category:Monuments and memorials in Utah
- Mormon
- Mormon Corridor
- Mormon Miracle Pageant
- Mormon Tabernacle Choir
- Mormon Trail
- Mount Nebo
- Mount Peale
- Mount Timpanogos
- Mountain Meadows massacre
- Mountains of Utah
  - Mountain peaks of the Rocky Mountains
  - commons:Category:Mountains of Utah
- Mountain passes in Utah
- Mountain ranges in Utah
- Museums in Utah
  - Category:Museums in Utah
    - commons:Category:Museums in Utah
- Music of Utah
  - Category:Music of Utah
    - commons:Category:Music of Utah
  - Category:Musical groups from Utah
  - Category:Musicians from Utah

== N ==
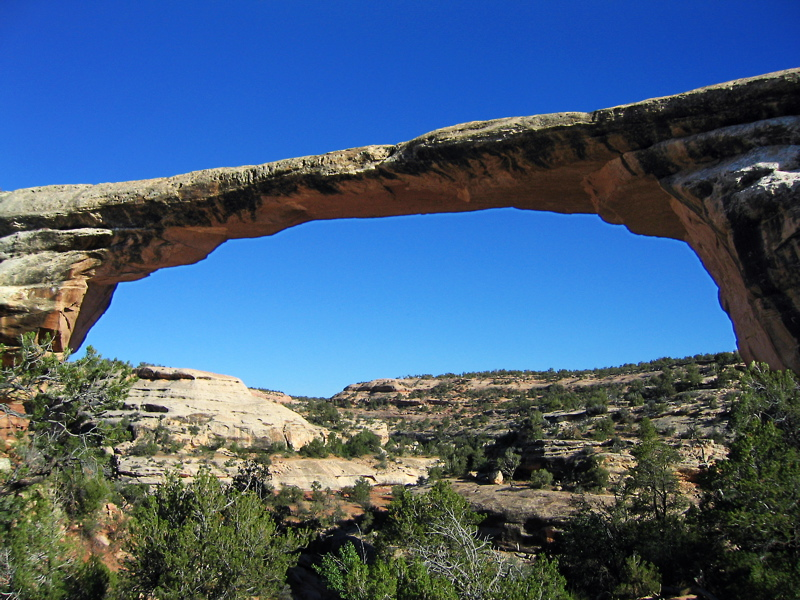
Owachomo Natural Bridge in Natural Bridges National Monument

- National forests of Utah
  - commons:Category:National Forests of Utah
- National monuments of Utah
  - commons:Category:National Monuments of Utah
- National Natural Landmarks in Utah
- National Parks in Utah
- National Scenic Byways in Utah
- National Wilderness Areas in Utah
- National Wildlife Refuges in Utah
- Native Americans in Utah
- Natural arches of Utah
  - commons:Category:Natural arches of Utah
- Natural Bridges National Monument
- Natural disasters in Utah
- Natural history of Utah
  - commons:Category:Natural history of Utah
- Navajo Nation (Native American)
- Navajo people
- Newspaper Rock
- Newspapers in Utah

== O ==
- Old Spanish Trail
- Olympic Winter Games 2002
- Oncorhynchus clarki utah
- Organizations based in Utah
- Oryzopsis hymenoides
- Ouray National Wildlife Refuge
- Outdoor sculptures in Utah
  - commons:Category:Outdoor sculptures in Utah

== P ==
- Parks in Utah
- People from Utah
  - Category:People from Utah
    - commons:Category:People from Utah
    - Category:People from Utah by populated place
    - Category:People from Utah by county
- Picea pungens
- Politics of Utah
  - commons:Category:Politics of Utah
- Pony Express
- Professional sports teams in Utah
- Protected areas of Utah
  - commons:Category:Protected areas of Utah
- Prunus avium

== R ==
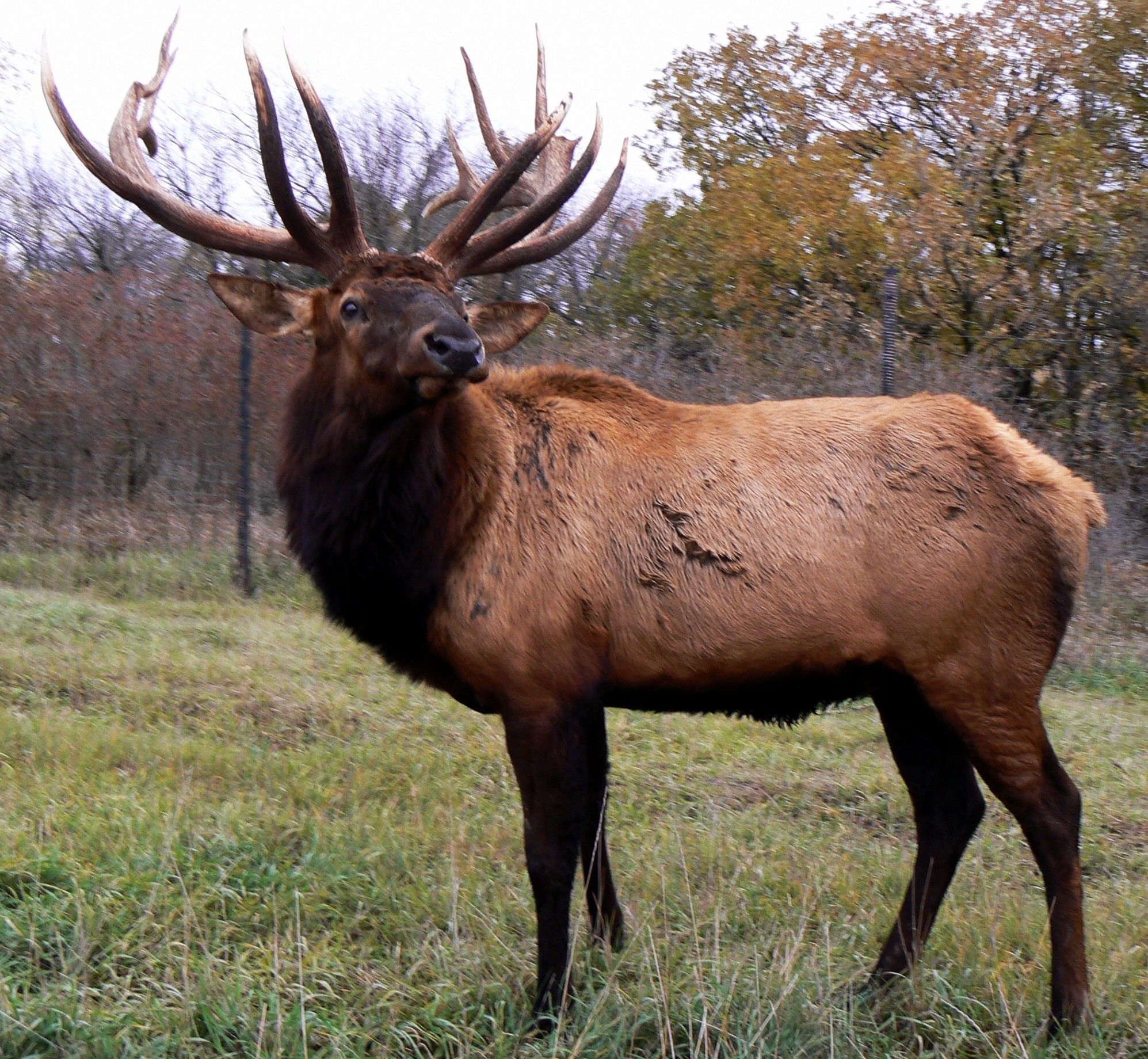
Native Utah Rocky Mountain Elk

- Radio stations in Utah
- Railroad museums in Utah
  - commons:Category:Railroad museums in Utah
- Railroads in Utah
- Rainbow Bridge National Monument
- Regions of Utah
- Registered Historic Places in Utah
- Religion in Utah
  - Category:Religion in Utah
    - commons:Category:Religion in Utah
  - Religious buildings and structures in Utah
- Rivers in Utah
- Rock formations in Utah
  - commons:Category:Rock formations in Utah
- Rocky Mountain Elk
- Rocky Mountain Region
- Rocky Mountains
- Roller coasters in Utah
  - commons:Category:Roller coasters in Utah

== S ==
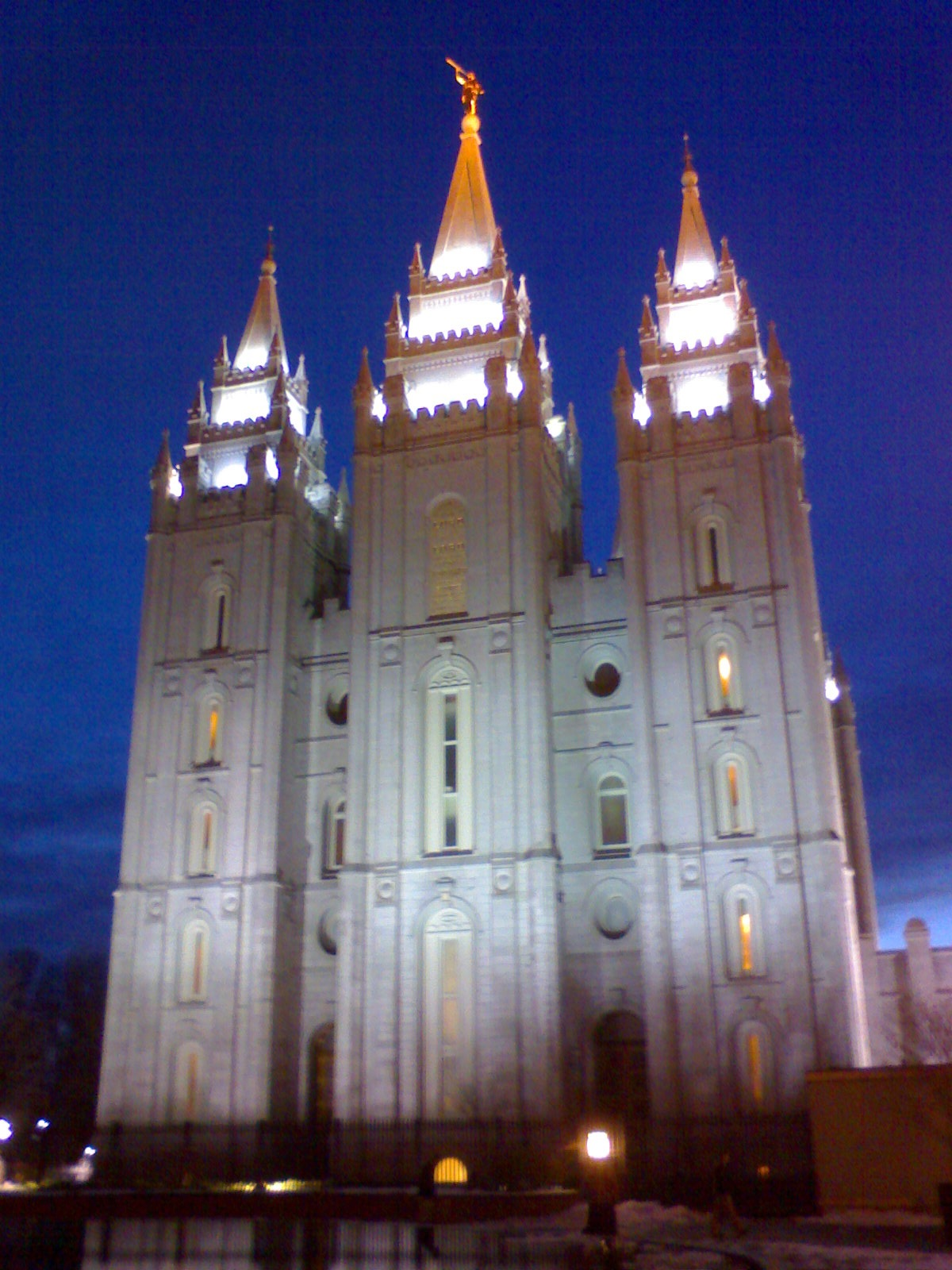
Salt Lake City Temple

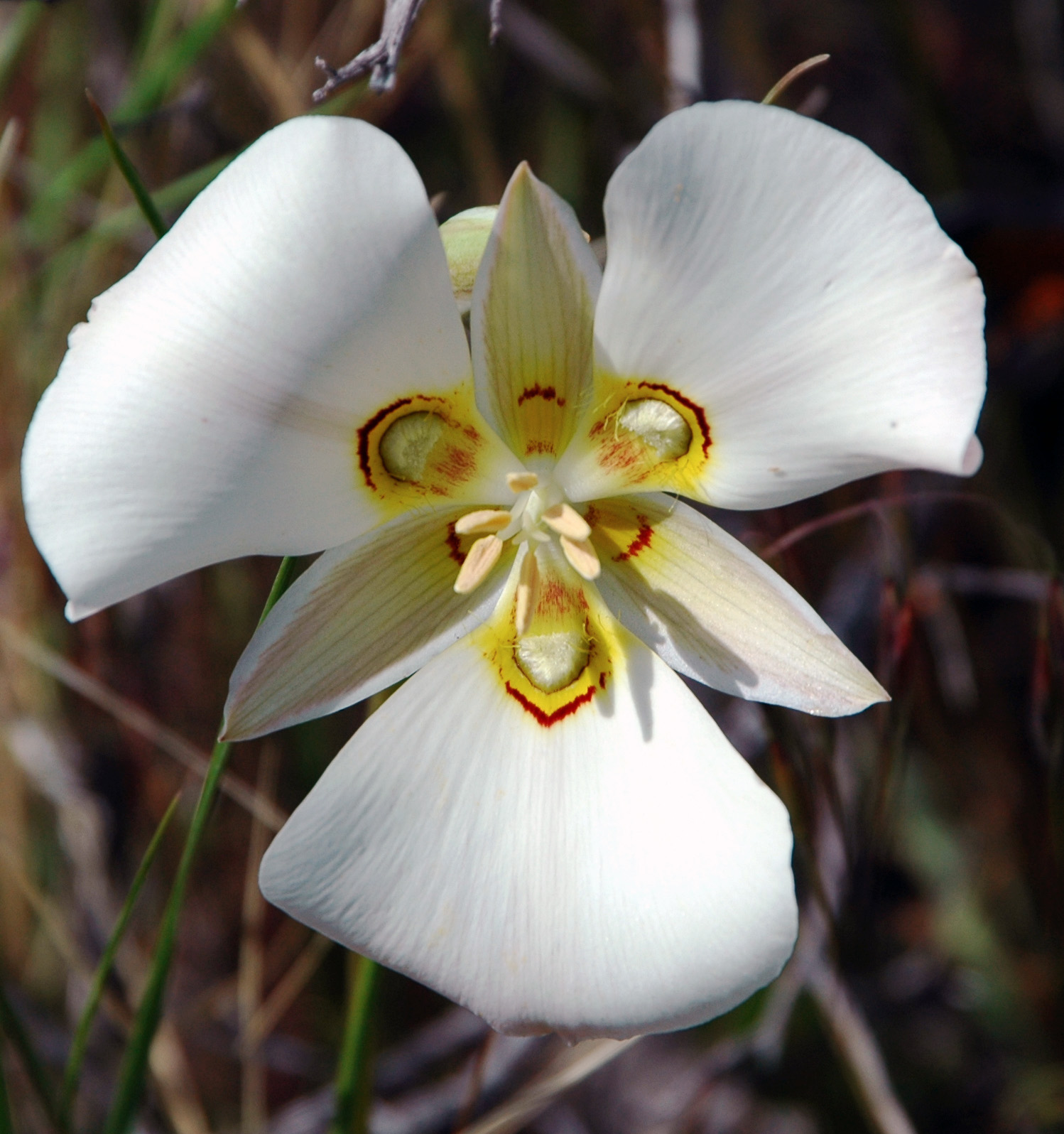
Native Utah Sego Lily

- Salt Lake City, Utah, capital of the extralegal State of Deseret 1849–1850, territorial and state capital since 1858
  - Salt Lake City mayors
  - Salt Lake City media
- Salt Palace
- Salt Lake Tabernacle
- Salt Lake Temple
- Salt Lake Tribune
- San Rafael Swell
- Sawtooth National Forest
- Scenic byways of Utah
- School districts in Utah
- Scouting in Utah
- Seal of the State of Utah
- Sego Lily
- Settlements in Utah
  - Cities in Utah
  - Towns in Utah
  - Townships in Utah
  - Census Designated Places in Utah
  - Other unincorporated communities in Utah
  - List of ghost towns in Utah
- Ski areas and resorts in Utah
  - commons:Category:Ski areas and resorts in Utah
- Southern Utah Wilderness Alliance, environmental organization
- Spanish sweet onion
- Sports in Utah
  - Category:Sports in Utah
    - commons:Category:Sports in Utah
  - Category:Sports venues in Utah
    - commons:Category:Sports venues in Utah
- Square dance
- State highways in Utah
- State legislatures of Utah
- State of Deseret
- State of Utah website
  - Government of the State of Utah
    - Category:Government of Utah
      - commons:Category:Government of Utah
  - Constitution of the State of Utah
  - Executive branch of the government of the State of Utah
  - Legislative branch of the government of the State of Utah
  - Judicial branch of the government of the State of Utah
- State parks of Utah
- State police of Utah
- State prisons of Utah
- Structures in Utah
  - commons:Category:Buildings and structures in Utah
- Sundance Film Festival
- Sundance Institute
- Supreme Court of the State of Utah
- Symbols of the State of Utah:
  - Utah state bird
  - Utah state cooking pot
  - Utah state emblem
  - Utah state fish
  - Utah state flag
  - Utah state flower
  - Utah state folk dance
  - Utah state fossil
  - Utah state fruit
  - Utah state gem
  - Utah state grass
  - Utah state hymn
  - Utah state insect
  - Utah state mammal
  - Utah state mineral
  - Utah state motto
  - Utah state nickname
  - Utah state rock
  - Utah state seal
  - Utah state snack food
  - Utah state song
  - Utah state star
  - Utah state stellar cluster
  - Utah state tartan
  - Utah state tree
  - Utah state vegetable

== T ==
The Golden Spike Ceremony for the First transcontinental railroad across North America in 1869.

- Telecommunications in Utah
  - commons:Category:Communications in Utah
- Telephone area codes in Utah
- Television shows set in Utah
- Television stations in Utah
- Temple Square
- Territory of Utah
- Theatres in Utah
  - commons:Category:Theatres in Utah
- Timpanogos Cave National Monument
- Topaz
- Tourism in Utah website
  - commons:Category:Tourism in Utah
- Towns in Utah
- Townships in Utah
- Transcontinental Railroad
- Transportation in Utah
  - Category:Transportation in Utah
    - commons:Category:Transport in Utah
- Treaty of Guadalupe Hidalgo of 1848
- Trees of Utah

== U ==
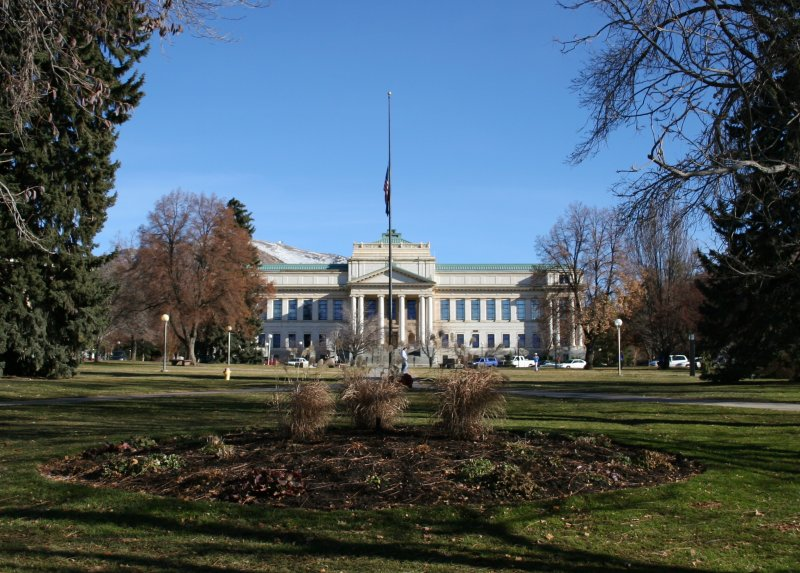
University of Utah

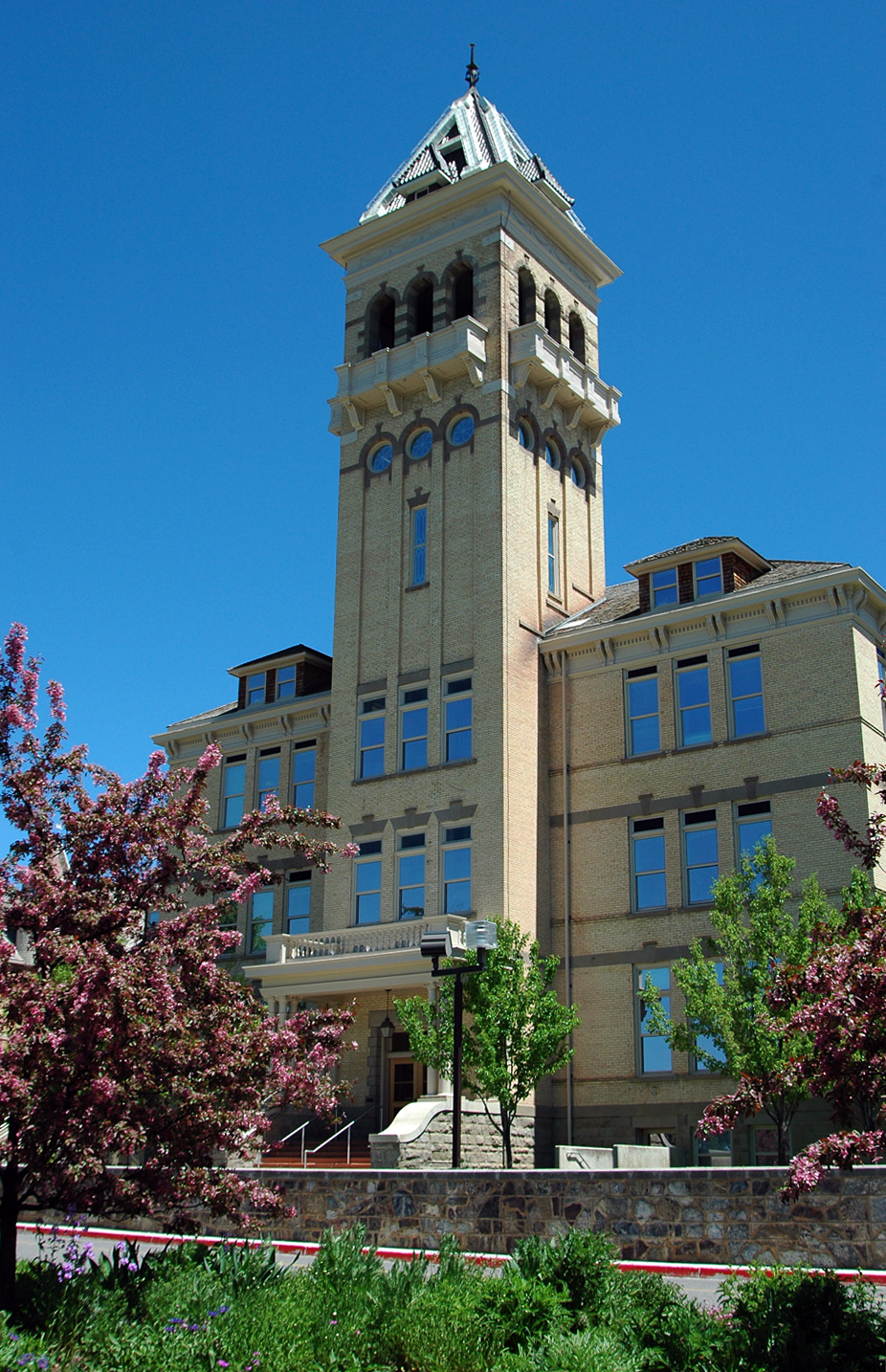
Utah State University

- Uinta Mountains
- Uinta-Wasatch-Cache National Forest
- Unincorporated communities in Utah
- Union Pacific Railroad
- United States of America
  - States of the United States of America
  - United States census statistical areas of Utah
  - Utah's congressional delegations
  - United States congressional districts in Utah
  - United States Court of Appeals for the Tenth Circuit
  - United States District Court for the District of Utah
  - United States representatives from Utah
  - United States senators from Utah
- University of Utah
  - University of Utah graduates
- US-UT – ISO 3166-2:US region code for the State of Utah
- UT – United States Postal Service postal code for the State of Utah
- Utah website
  - Category:Utah
    - commons:Category:Utah
      - commons:Category:Maps of Utah
- Utah Centennial Tartan website
- Utah Chamber Artists
- Utah Coalition for Educational Technology
- Utah Court of Appeals
- Utah Department of Transportation
- Utah Division of Services for People with Disabilities
- Utah Education Association
- Utah Foster Care
- Utah Geological Survey
- Utah Highway Patrol
- Utah housing corporation
- Utah in the American Civil War
- Utah Jazz
- Utah Lake
- Utah Olympic Oval
- Utah Seismic Safety Commission
- Utah Shakespearean Festival
- Utah State Capital
- Utah State Capitol
- Utah State Office of Rehabilitation
- Utah State Parks
- Utah State University
  - Utah State University graduates
- Utah Supreme Court
- Utah Symphony Orchestra
- Utah Transfer of Public Lands Act
- Utah Transit Authority
- Utah Venture Capital Enhancement Act
- Utah wine
- Utah, This is the Place
- Utah, We Love Thee
- Utah’s HCBS ID/RC Waiver
- Ute Nation (Native American)

== V ==
- Valleys in Utah
- Volcanoes in Utah

== W ==
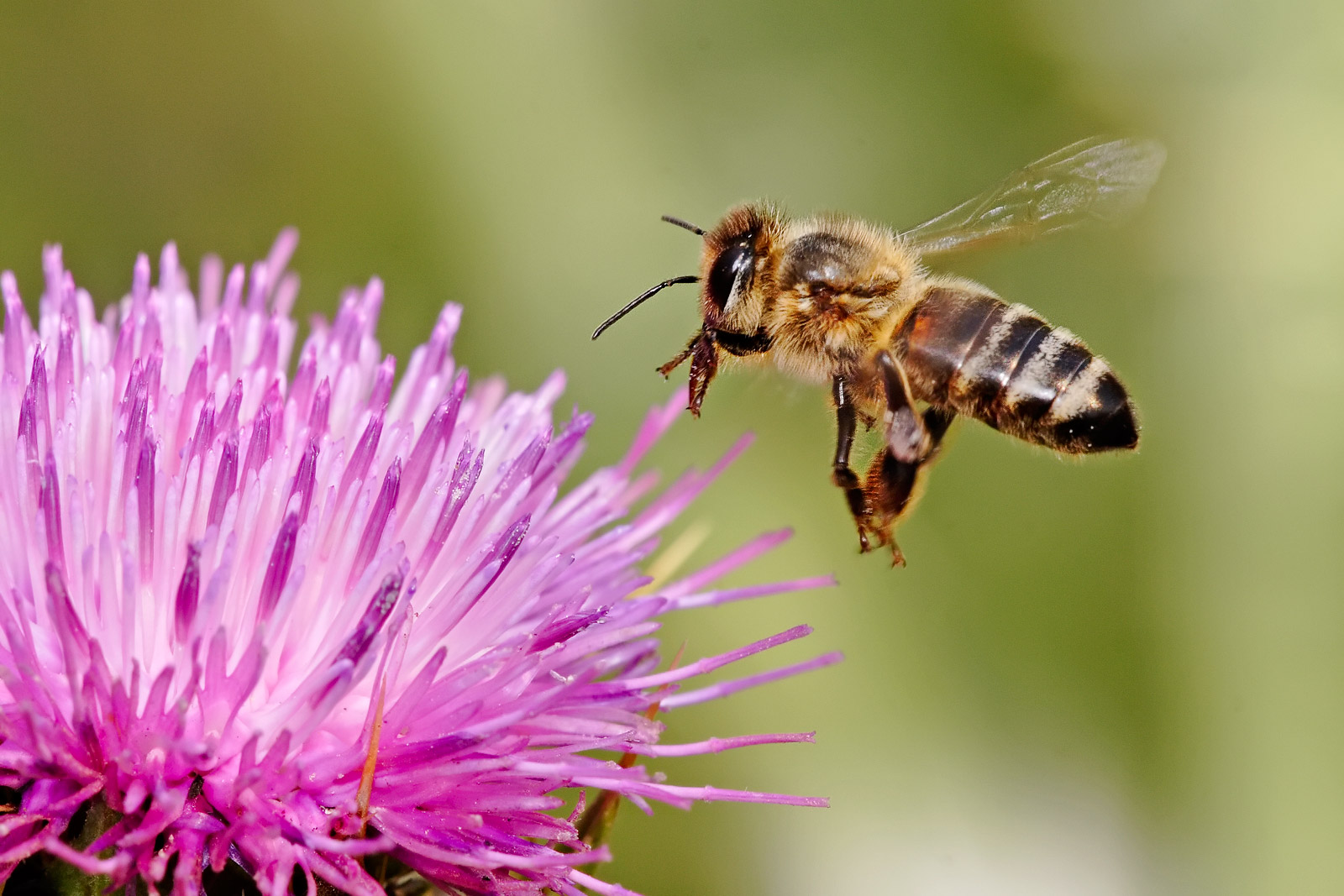
Western honey bee

- Wasatch Front
- Wasatch Range
- Waterfalls of Utah
  - commons:Category:Waterfalls of Utah
- Watersheds in Utah
- Western honey bee
- Western Pacific Railroad
- Western Rocky Mountains
- Wetlands in Utah
  Wikimedia
  - Wikimedia Commons:Category:Utah
    - commons:Category:Maps of Utah
  - Wikinews:Category:Utah
    - Wikinews:Portal:Utah
  - Wikipedia Category:Utah
    - Wikipedia Portal:Utah
    - Wikipedia:WikiProject Utah
      - Category:WikiProject Utah articles
      - Category:WikiProject Utah participants
- Winter Olympics 2002
- Writers from Utah

== X ==
- XIX Olympic Winter Games

== Y ==
- Young, Brigham

== Z ==
- Zion National Park
- Zoos in Utah
  - commons:Category:Zoos in Utah

== See also ==
- Topic overview:
  - Utah
  - Outline of Utah
