= List of 57th Utah State Legislature committees =

This is a list of the 57th Utah State Legislature standing committees and appropriations subcommittees. The 57th Utah State Legislature began on Monday, January 15, 2007.

== Senate standing committees ==
=== Business ===
Republicans	Democrats
Kevin VanTassell, Chair, (R-26); Dan Eastman, (R-23); Bill Hickman, (R-29); Wayne Niederhauser, (R-9); Carlene Walker, (R-9)	Gene Davis, (D-3); Ed Mayne (D-5)

=== Education ===
Republicans	Democrats
Margaret Dayton, Chair, (R-15); Curtis Bramble, (R-16); Greg Bell, (R-22); Lyle Hillyard, (R-25); Darin Peterson, (R-24); Howard Stephenson, (R-11)	Ross Romero, (D-7); Pat Jones, (D-4)

=== Government Operations & Political Subdivisions ===
Republicans	Democrats
Peter Knudson, Chair, (R-17); Bill Hickman, (R-29); Chris Buttars, (R-10); Scott Jenkins, (R-20)	Scott McCoy, (D-2); Ross Romero, (D-7)

=== Health and Human Services ===
Republicans	Democrats
Chris Buttars, Chair, (R-10); Peter Knudson, (R-17); Allen Christensen, (R-19)	Brent Goodfellow, (D-12); Scott McCoy, (D-2)

=== Judiciary, Law Enforcement & Criminal Justice ===
Republicans	Democrats
Greg Bell, Chair, (R-22); John Valentine, (R-14); Lyle Hillyard, (R-25); Jon Greiner, (R-18); Mark Madsen, (R-13)	Scott McCoy, (D-2); Ross Romero, (D-7)

=== Natural Resources, Agriculture and Environment ===
Republicans	Democrats
Darin Peterson, Chair, (R-24); Allen Christensen, (R-19); Margaret Dayton, (R-15); Dennis Stowell, (R-28); Michael Waddoups, (R-6)	Gene Davis, (D-3); Fred Fife, (D-1)

=== Revenue and Taxation ===
Republicans	Democrats
Wayne Niederhauser, Chair, (R-9); John Valentine, (R-14); Curtis Bramble, (R-16); Jon Greiner, (R-18); Howard Stephenson, (R-11); Michael Waddoups, (R-6)	Mike Dmitrich, (D-27); Brent Goodfellow, (D-12)

=== Transportation, Public Utilities & Technology ===
Republicans	Democrats
Carlene Walker, Chair, (R-8); Sheldon Killpack, (R-21); Scott Jenkins, (R-20); Kevin VanTassell, (R-26)	Mike Dmitrich, (D-27); Ed Mayne, (D-5)

=== Retirement & Independent Entities ===
Republicans	Democrats
Curtis Bramble, Chair, (R-16); Chris Buttars, (R-10); Darin Peterson, (R-24); Carlene Walker, (R-8)	Gene Davis, (D-3); Brent Goodfellow, (D-12)

=== Workforce Services, Community & Economic Development ===
Republicans	Democrats
Mark Madsen, Chair, (R-13); Dan Eastman, (R-23); Sheldon Killpack, (R-21); Dennis Stowell, (R-28)	Fred Fife, (D-1); Pat Jones, (D-4)

=== Senate Rules ===
Republicans	Democrats
Bill Hickman, Chair, (R-29); Peter Knudson, (R-17); Greg Bell (R-22); Chris Buttars, (R-10); Darin Peterson, (R-24)	Gene Davis, (D-3); Ed Mayne, (D-5)

== House standing committees ==
=== Business and Labor ===
Republicans	Democrats
Stephen D. Clark, Chair (R-63); James A. Dunnigan, Vice-Chair (R-39); David Clark (R-74); Ben C. Ferry (R-2); Gage Froerer (R-8); Kevin S. Garn (R-16); Todd E. Kiser (R-41); Michael T. Morley (R-66); Paul A. Neuenschwander (R-66); Mark W. Walker (R-20)	Jackie Biskupski (D-30); Carl W. Duckworth (D-22); Neil A. Hansen (D-9)

=== Education ===
Republicans	Democrats
Gregory H. Hughes, Chair (R-51); Patrick Painter, Vice-Chair (R-67); Sylvia S. Andersen (R-48); Brad L. Dee (R-11); Craig A. Frank (R-57); Kory M. Holdaway (R-34); Bradley G. Last (R-71); Rebecca D. Lockhart (R-64); Merlynn T. Newbold (R-50); Kenneth W. Sumsion (R-56); Stephen H. Urquhart (R-75)	James R. Gowans (D-21); Carol Spackman Moss (D-37); LaWanna Lou Shurtliff (D-10); Mark A. Wheatley (D-35)

=== Ethics ===
Republicans	Democrats
Todd E. Kiser, Co-Chair (R-41); Douglas C. Aagard (R-15); D. Gregg Buxton (R-12); Merlynn T. Newbold (R-50)	David Litvack (D-26); Karen W. Morgan (D-46); Carol Spackman Moss (D-37); LaWanna Lou Shurtliff (D-10)

=== Government Operations ===
Republicans	Democrats
Glenn A. Donnelson, Chair (R-7); John G. Mathis, Vice-Chair(R-55); Douglas C. Aagard (R-15); DeMar Bud Bowman (R-72); Lorie D. Fowlke (R-59); Keith Grover (R-61); Eric K. Hutchings (R-38); Curtis Oda (R-14)	Neil A. Hansen (D-9); Neal B. Hendrickson (D-33); Larry B. Wiley (D-31)

=== Health and Human Services ===
Republicans	Democrats
Paul Ray, Chair (R-13); Ronda Rudd Menlove, Vice-Chair (R-1); D. Gregg Buxton (R-12); John Dougall (R-27); Wayne A. Harper (R-43); Stephen E. Sandstrom (R-58)	David Litvack (D-26); Phil Riesen (D-36)

=== Judiciary ===
Republicans	Democrats
Douglas C. Aagard, Chair (R-15); Lorie D. Fowlke, Vice-Chair (R-59); Sheryl L. Allen (R-19); Jim Bird (R-42); Kevin S. Garn (R-16); Keith Grover (R-61); Eric K. Hutchings (R-38); Kay L. McIff (R-70); Scott L Wyatt (R-5)	Jackie Biskupski (D-30); Christine A. Johnson (D-25); Rosalind J. McGee (D-28); Mark A. Wheatley (D-35)

=== Law Enforcement and Criminal Justice ===
Republicans	Democrats
DeMar Bud Bowman, Chair (R-72); Curtis Oda, Vice-Chair (R-14); Brad L. Dee (R-11); Rebecca D. Lockhart (R-64); Michael T. Morley (R-66); Paul Ray (R-13); Kenneth W. Sumsion (R-56); Carl Wimmer (R-52)	David Litvack (D-26); Jennifer M. Seelig (D-23); Larry B. Wiley (D-31(

=== Natural Resources, Agriculture and Environment ===
Republicans	Democrats
Roger E. Barrus, Chair (R-18); Kerry W. Gibson, Vice-Chair (R-6); Sylvia S. Andersen (R-48); Melvin R. Brown (R-53); Glenn A. Donnelson (R-7); Jack R. Draxler (R-3); John G. Mathis (R-55); Michael E. Noel (R-73); Patrick Painter (R-67); Stephen E. Sandstrom (R-58); Richard W. Wheeler (R-68)	Carl W. Duckworth (D-22); James R. Gowans (D-21); Neal B. Hendrickson (D-33); Phil Riesen (D-36)

=== Political Subdivisions ===
Republicans	Democrats
Fred R. Hunsaker, Chair (R-4); Scott L Wyatt, Vice-Chair (R-5); Sheryl L. Allen (R-19); D. Gregg Buxton (R-12); James A. Dunnigan (R-39); Gage Froerer (R-8); Kerry W. Gibson (R-6); Stephen H. Urquhart (R-75)	Ralph Becker (D-24); Jennifer M. Seelig (D-23); LaWanna Lou Shurtliff (D-10)

=== Public Utilities and Technology ===
Republicans	Democrats
Michael E. Noel, Chair (R-73); Aaron Tilton, Vice-Chair (R-65); Jim Bird (R-42); Melvin R. Brown (R-53); Fred R. Hunsaker (R-4); Steven R. Mascaro (R-47); Kay L. McIff (R-70); Richard W. Wheeler (R-68)	Ralph Becker (D-24); Janice M. Fisher (D-29); Lynn N. Hemingway (D-40)

=== Retirement and Independent Entities ===
Republicans	Democrats
John Dougall, Chair (R-27); Aaron Tilton, Vice-Chair (R-65); David Clark (R-74); Wayne A. Harper (R-43); Bradley G. Last (R-71); Merlynn T. Newbold (R-50)	Neil A. Hansen (D-9); Karen W. Morgan (D-46); LaWanna Lou Shurtliff (D-10)

=== Revenunes and Taxation ===
Republicans	Democrats
John Dougall, Chair (R-27); Craig A. Frank, Vice-Chair (R-57); Roger E. Barrus (R-18); Bigelow, Ron C. (R-32); Tim Cosgrove (D-44); Wayne A. Harper (R-43); Gregory H. Hughes (R-51); Bradley G. Last (R-71); Merlynn T. Newbold (R-50); Gordon E. Snow (R-54); Aaron Tilton (R-65); Carl Wimmer (R-52)	Christine A. Johnson (D-25); Rosalind J. McGee (D-28); Carol Spackman Moss (D-37)

=== Rules ===
Republicans	Democrats
Stephen H. Urquhart, Chair (R-75); Gregory H. Hughes, Vice-Chair (R-51); James A. Dunnigan (R-39); Kevin S. Garn (R-16); Michael T. Morley (R-66); Mark W. Walker (R-45)	Jackie Biskupski (D-30); Neal B. Hendrickson (D-33)

=== Transportation ===
Republicans	Democrats
Todd E. Kiser, Chair (R-41); Bradley M. Daw, Vice-Chair (R-60); Jeff Alexander (R-62); Stephen D. Clark (R-63); Tim Cosgrove (D-44); Ben C. Ferry (R-2); Julie Fisher (R-17); Kory M. Holdaway (R-34); Ronda Rudd Menlove (R-1); Paul A. Neuenschwander (R-20); Gordon E. Snow (R-54); Mark W. Walker (R-45)	Lynn N. Hemingway (D-40); Brad King (D-69); Karen W. Morgan (D-46)

=== Workforce Services and Community and Economic Development ===
Republicans	Democrats
Steven R. Mascaro, Chair (R-47); Julie Fisher, Vice-Chair (R-17); Jeff Alexander (R-62); Bradley M. Daw (R-60); Jack R. Draxler (R-3)	Brad King (D-69); Janice M. Fisher (D-29); Karen W. Morgan (D-46)

== Joint Appropriation Subcommittees ==
=== Capital Facilities & Administration ===
Republicans	Democrats
Sen. Scott K. Jenkins, Co-Chair, (R-20); Rep. D. Gregg Buxton, Co-Chair (R-12); Rep. DeMar Bud Bowman (R-72); Rep. Stephen D. Clark (R-63); Rep. Fred R. Hunsaker (R-4); Sen. Sheldon Killpack, (R-21); Sen. Darin Peterson, (R-24); Rep. Gordon E. Snow (R-54); Rep. Mark W. Walker (R-45); Rep. Richard W. Wheeler (R-68)	Rep. Ralph Becker (D-24); Rep. Janice M. Fisher (D-29); Sen. Mike Dmitrich, (D-27)

=== Commerce & Workfore Services ===
Republicans	Democrats
Sen. Jon J. Greiner, Co-Chair, (R-18); Rep. Michael T. Morley, Co-Chair (R-66); Rep. Sylvia S. Andersen (R-48); Rep. James A. Dunnigan (R-39); Rep. Craig A. Frank (R-57); Sen. Mark B. Madsen, (R-13); Sen. Wayne Niederhauser, (R-9)	Rep. Lynn N. Hemingway (D-40); Sen. Ed Mayne, (D-5); Rep. Mark A. Wheatley (D-35); Rep. Larry B. Wiley (D-31)

=== Economic Development & Revenue ===
Republicans	Democrats
Sen. John W. (Bill) Hickman, Co-Chair, (R-29); Rep. Sheryl L. Allen, Co-Chair (R-19); Rep. Jim Bird (R-42); Sen. Dan R. Eastman, (R-23); Rep. Steven R. Mascaro (R-47)	Rep. Jackie Biskupski (D-30); Sen. Gene Davis, (D-3); Rep. Julie Fisher (D-29)

=== Executive Appropriations ===
Republicans	Democrats
Sen. Lyle W. Hillyard, Co-Chair, (R-25); Rep. Bigelow, Ron C., Co-Chair (R-32); Sen. Peter C. Knudson, Vice-Chair, (R-17); Rep. Rebecca D. Lockhart, Vice-Chair (R-64); Sen. Curtis S. Bramble (R-16); Rep. David Clark (R-74); Rep. Greg J. Curtis (R-49); Rep. Brad L. Dee (R-11); Sen. Dan R. Eastman (R-23); Sen. Sheldon L. Killpack (R-21); Rep. Gordon E. Snow (R-54); Sen. John L. Valentine (R-14)	Rep. Ralph Becker (D-24); Sen. Gene Davis (D-3); Sen. Mike Dmitrich (D-27); Sen. Patricia W. Jones (D-4); Rep. Brad King (D-69); Rep. David Litvack (D-26); Sen. Ed Mayne (D-5); Rep. Carol Spackman Moss (D-37)

=== Executive Office & Criminal Justice ===
Republicans	Democrats
Sen. Michael G. Waddoups, Co-Chair, (R-6); Rep. Eric K. Hutchings, Co-Chair (R-38); Rep. Douglas C. Aagard (R-15); Sen. Curt Bramble, (R-16); Rep. Keith Grover (R-61); Rep. Curtis Oda (R-14)	Rep. Brad King (D-69); Sen. Scott D. McCoy (D-2); Rep. Jennifer M. Seelig (D-23)

=== Health & Human Services ===
Republicans	Democrats
Sen. Allen Christensen, Co-Chair, (R-19); Rep. Merlynn T. Newbold, Co-Chair (R-50); Sen. Chris Buttars, (R-10); Sen. Peter C. Knudson, (R-17); Rep. Paul A. Neuenschwander (R-20); Rep. Paul Ray (R-13); Rep. Kenneth W. Sumsion (R-56); Rep. Stephen H. Urquhart (R-75)	Rep. David Litvack (D-26); Rep. Rosalind J. McGee (D-28); Sen. Ross I. Romero, (D-7)

=== Higher Education ===
Republicans	Democrats
Sen. Greg Bell, Co-Chair, (R-22); Rep. Kory M. Holdaway, Co-Chair (R-34); Rep. Bigelow, Ron C. (R-32); Sen. Curt Bramble (R-16); Rep. Melvin R. Brown (R-53); Rep. David Clark (R-74); Rep. Bradley M. Daw (R-60); Rep. John Dougall (R-27); Sen. Dan R. Eastman (R-23); Rep. Kay L. McIff (R-70); Rep. Scott L Wyatt (R-5)	Sen. Brent H. Goodfellow (D-12); Rep. Christine A. Johnson (D-25); Rep. Carol Spackman Moss (D-37); Rep. LaWanna Lou Shurtliff (D-10)

=== Natural Resources ===
Republicans	Democrats
Dennis E. Stowell, Co-Chair, (R-28); Rep. Ben C. Ferry, Co-Chair (R-2); Rep. Roger E. Barrus (R-18); Rep. Jack R. Draxler (R-3); Rep. Kerry W. Gibson (R-6); Rep. John G. Mathis (R-55); Rep. Michael E. Noel (R-73); Rep. Stephen E. Sandstrom (R-58); Sen. John L. Valentine, (R-14); Sen. Margaret Dayton, (R-15)	Sen. Mike Dmitrich, (D-27); Rep. Carl W. Duckworth (D-22); Rep. James R. Gowans (D-21)

=== Public Education ===
Republicans	Democrats
Sen. Howard A. Stephenson, Co-Chair, (R-11); Rep. Bradley G. Last, Co Chair (R-71); Rep. Brad L. Dee (R-11); Rep. Lorie D. Fowlke (R-59); Rep. Gage Froerer (R-8); Sen. Lyle W. Hillyard, (R-25); Rep. Gregory H. Hughes (R-51); Rep. Ronda Rudd Menlove (R-1); Rep. Aaron Tilton (R-65); Sen. Kevin VanTassell, (R-26); Rep. Carl Wimmer (R-52)	Rep. Tim Cosgrove (D-44); Sen. Patricia W. Jones (D-4); Rep. Karen W. Morgan (D-46); Rep. Phil Riesen (D-36)

=== Retirement & Independent Entities ===
Republicans	Democrats
Sen. Curt Bramble, Co-Chair, (R-16); Rep. John Dougall, Co-Chair (R-27); Rep. Aaron Tilton, Vice Chair (R-65); Sen. Chris Buttars, (R-11); Rep. David Clark (R-74); Rep. Wayne A. Harper (R-43); Rep. Bradley G. Last (R-71); Rep. Merlynn T. Newbold (R-50); Sen. Darin Peterson (R-24); Sen. Carlene M. Walker, (R-8)	Sen. Gene Davis, (D-3); Sen. Brent H. Goodfellow, (D-12); Rep. Neil A. Hansen (D-9); Rep. Karen W. Morgan (D-46); Rep. LaWanna Lou Shurtliff (D-10)

=== Transportation & Environmental Quality ===
Current members

Republicans	Democrats
Sen. Carlene M. Walker, Co-Chair, (R-8); Rep. Wayne A. Harper, Co-Chair (R-43); Rep. Glenn A. Donnelson (R-7); Rep. Kevin S. Garn (R-16); Sen. Sheldon Killpack, (R-21); Rep. Todd E. Kiser (R-41); Rep. Rebecca D. Lockhart (R-64); Rep. Patrick Painter (R-67); Sen. John L. Valentine, (R-14)	Sen. Fred Fife, (D-1); Rep. Neil A. Hansen (D-9); Rep. Neal B. Hendrickson (D-33)
