= Kay Christofferson =

American politician

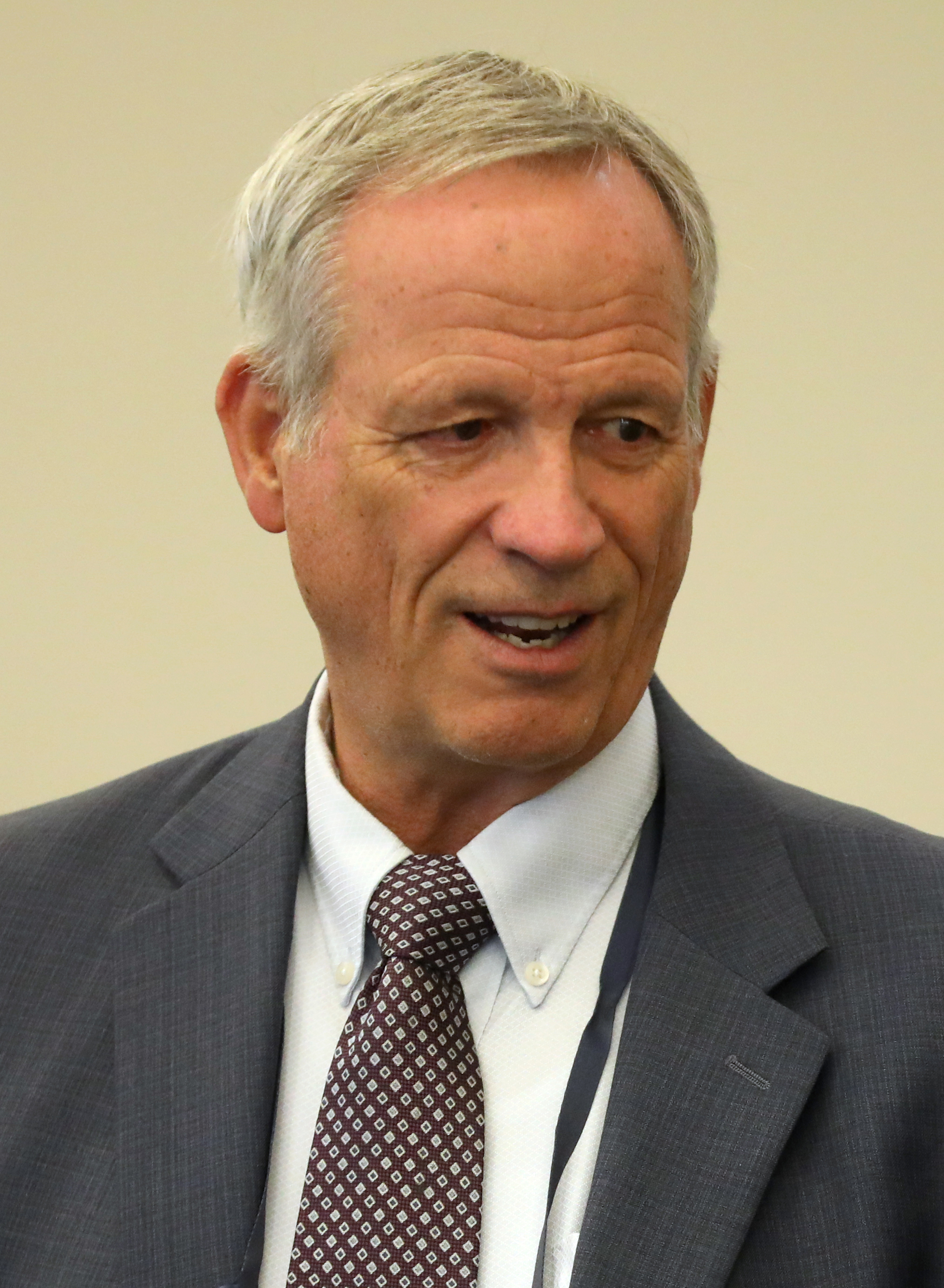

Member of the Utah House of Representatives
- Incumbent
- Assumed office January 1, 2013
- Preceded by: Ken Sumsion
- Constituency: 56th district (2013–2023); 53rd district (2023–present)

Personal details
- Born: February 19 Lehi, Utah
- Party: Republican
- Education: Brigham Young University
- Profession: Civil Engineer
- Website: christofferson56.com

Kay J. Christofferson is an American politician and a Republican member of the Utah House of Representatives representing District 53.

== Early life ==
Christofferson was born in Lehi, Utah.

== Education ==
Christofferson earned his degree in civil engineering from Brigham Young University. He lists his occupation as a civil engineer with Horrocks Engineers.

== Political career ==
2012 - When District 56 incumbent Republican Representative Ken Sumsion ran for Governor of Utah, Christofferson ran in the June 26, 2012 Republican primary, winning with 2,261 votes (58.8%), and won the November 6, 2012 general election with 11,921 votes (87.5%) against Democratic nominee Leslie Dalton.

2014 - Christofferson ran unopposed in both the Republican convention and the general election.

During the 2016 legislative session, he served on the Natural Resources, Agriculture, and Environmental Quality Appropriations Subcommittee, House Transportation Committee as well as the House Public Utilities and Technology Committee.

== 2016 sponsored legislation ==
Bill number	Bill title	Status
HB0029	Transportation Interim Committee Reports Amendments	Governor Signed - 3/22/2016
HB0287S01	Commission for the Stewardship of Public Lands and Private Donations for Public Lands Litigation	House/ filed - 3/30/2016
HB0339S01	Child Welfare Services Amendments	Governor Signed - 3/23/2016
HB0435S01	Teacher Salary Supplement Amendments	House/ filed - 3/10/2016

Christofferson also floor sponsored SB0074S01 Aviation Amendments.

== Personal life ==
Christofferson is married and has seven children. Christofferson resides in Lehi, Utah.
