= Bruce R. Cutler =

American politician (born 1950)

Bruce Cutler

Member of the Utah House of Representatives from the 44th district
- In office January 1, 2015 – January 28, 2019
- Preceded by: Tim Cosgrove
- Succeeded by: Andrew Stoddard

Personal details
- Born: July 29, 1950 Cottonwood Heights, Utah
- Party: Republican
- Education: University of Utah

Bruce R. Cutler (born July 29, 1950, Cottonwood Heights, Utah) is an American politician. He was a Republican member of the Utah House of Representatives representing District 44 from January 1, 2015 through December 2018.

== Early life and education ==
Cutler was born in Cottonwood Heights, Utah. When he was 15 his family moved to the East Millcreek area where he attended Skyline High School. He served as a missionary for the Church of Jesus Christ of Latter-day Saints in the Uruguay-Paraguay mission. He received a BS degree in Computer Science from the University of Utah. He currently lives in Murray, Utah with his wife Kathie and four daughters.

== Political career ==
In 2014, Cutler defeated John Jackson and Raymond Poole in the Republican convention and won the November 4, 2014 general election against Democratic nominee Christine Passey and Libertarian nominee Bret Black with 4,208 votes (48.5%).

During the 2016 general session Cutler served on the House Education Committee, House Judiciary Committee, and Public Education Appropriations Subcommittee. During the interim he served on the Education Interim Committee and the Judiciary Interim Committee.

== 2016 sponsored legislation ==
Bill number	Bill title	Status
HB0043	State Instructional Materials Commission Amendments	Governor Signed - 3/18/2016
HB0071	Weighted Pupil Unit Calculation Equalization Amendments	House/ filed - 3/10/2016
HB0096S02	Single Sign-on Business Database	Governor Signed - 3/25/2016
HB0142	Agency Auditing Procedures for Education	Governor Signed - 3/23/2016
HB0147	State Board of Education	Governor Signed - 3/22/2016
HB0433	Minimum School Program Amendments	House/ filed - 3/7/2016
HB0461	Local School Entity Amendments	House/ filed - 3/10/2016

In 2016, Cutler did not floor sponsor any bills.
