= Andrew Stoddard =

American politician

Member of the Utah House of Representatives
- Incumbent
- Assumed office January 1, 2019
- Preceded by: Bruce R. Cutler
- Constituency: 44th district (2019–2023); 40th district (2023–present)

Personal details
- Party: Democratic
- Children: 4
- Education: University of Utah; Brigham Young University (JD)
- Website: https://www.voteandrewstoddard.com/about

Andrew Stoddard is a Democratic member of the Utah State House of Representatives, representing the 40th District. He lives in Sandy, Utah.

== Education and early career ==
Stoddard graduated from Brighton High School. He later earned a bachelor's degree from the University of Utah and a law degree from Brigham Young University. He worked in various positions in education, volunteering and working for agencies dealing with criminal justice, including the Utah Crime Victims Clinic, Rocky Mountain Innocence Center, and Murray City. Stoddard also served as the Chair of the Midvale Community Council, and as a Murray City Prosecutor for almost a decade. Stoddard currently works as a personal injury attorney for Craig Swapp & Associates.

== Political career ==
Stoddard was first elected on November 8, 2018. He defeated the incumbent, Republican Bruce Cutler, with 55% of the vote. During his first term, he sponsored gun control legislation.

In the 2022 General Session, Stoddard served on the Executive Appropriations Committee, the House Ethics Committee, the House Law Enforcement and Criminal Justice Committee, the House Revenue and Taxation Committee, the Infrastructure and General Government Appropriations Subcommittee, and the Legislative Management Committee

In the 2023 General Session, Stoddard served on the Law Enforcement & Criminal Justice Committee, Government Operations Committee, House Rules Committee, and the House Ethics Committee.

== 2022 sponsored legislation ==
- HB0057 Government Records Access Amendments
- HB0073S01 Post Certification Amendments
- HB0309 Process Server Amendments
- HB0310 Vital Records Special Characters
- HB0314S01 Inheritance Disqualification Amendments
- HB0325 Mental Health Support and Law Enforcement Co-response
- HCR002 Concurrent Resolution Encouraging Discussion about Prevention of Child Sexual Abuse,
- HCR014 Concurrent Resolution Honoring Utah Olympians and Paralympians

== Personal life ==
Stoddard spent most of his childhood in Sandy, Utah. He currently lives in Midvale, Utah and is married and has 4 children.
