= Utah's HCBS ID/RC Waiver =

Disability care program in Utah, United States

The Utah HCBS waiver program is a state-run program that serves individuals in Utah with intellectual disabilities or related conditions (ID/RC). HCBS stands for Home and Community-Based Services.

Started in 1986 the Utah HCBS waiver program is administered by the Division of Services for People with Disabilities (DSPD) of the Government of Utah.

== Background ==
HCBS waiver programs are designed to provide long-term care services such as work supports, supervised community living, and respite care to vulnerable populations. Types of HCBS waivers may include:

- care services for adults 65 or older,
- individuals living with acquired brain injuries,
- individuals living with intellectual disabilities, and
- Individuals living with other physical disabilities.

The term "waiver" is used to describe these programs as they waive traditional Medicaid statutory requirements regarding the setting in which long-term care services are provided. The enactment of these waiver programs ushered in a major paradigm shift for the long-term care industry and the individuals served by these programs. The goal of waivers is to improve the quality of life of those receiving long-term care. Since enactment, many individuals living in institutional settings have transitioned back into the community. Today, HCBS programs represent the preferred method of services delivery rather than institutionalization.

== History ==
In 1983, the US Congress added section 1915(c) to the Social Security Act. This addition provided for the creation of Medicaid waivers. It also outlined the contractual obligations of states choosing to establish waiver programs with Medicaid.

In 1986, Utah's waiver program for individuals with disabilities was established. The Office of Handicapped Services was tasked with administering the waivers. The agency began moving people who could safely receive care services in the community out of institutions. Those who preferred not to live in an institution were moved out of the State Developmental Center.

In 1998, the Division of Services for People with Disabilities (DSPD) introduced the Self-Administered method of services delivery in response to a large public demand for a more family-directed system of accessing services. Self-Administered services have allowed families to hire individuals they know to provide community care for their relatives

== Organizational structure ==
Much of the administration of services to qualifying recipients is done through contractual partnerships beginning at Medicaid's top agencies. Contractual arrangements continue down through those entities working directly with service recipients.

The Utah Department of Health, Division of Health Care Financing (Utah's Medicaid administering agency) contracts with the Center for Medicare and Medicaid Services in order to implement the HCBS waiver. This contract is known as the State Implementation Plan. The plan details exactly how the waiver is to be administered and defines the contractual obligations that Utah and the Department of Health, Division of Health Care Financing have agreed to. These obligations include important assurances that Medicaid-funded services will promote the health and welfare of all participants. DSPD is directly responsible for monitoring the application of these Medicaid funds (appropriated every year by the Utah state legislature) to ensure that they follow the guidelines established in the State Implementation plan.

DSPD is one of many agencies serving under the umbrella of the state's Department of Human Services. DSPD has one Division Director in charge of overseeing the work of six program managers. These program managers are tasked with overseeing one of the six following tasks:

- Finance and Contracts,
- Services,
- Quality Management,
- Research and Business Systems Management,
- Research Development and Technical Assistance, and
- Autism Pilot Program.

Private contractors deliver the actual services to clients. The division licenses private corporations and non-profit organizations to provide the long-term care services. Each of these entities establishes an individual contract with the division to provide services which meet the same guidelines set forth in the State Implementation Plan.

As of 2012, Rise Services, Inc. was the largest DSPD contractor, providing services totaling 14.4million dollars. In 2009 casework for DSPD services recipients was privatized. DSPD caseworkers are now licensed as private contractors and also establish their own contract with the division to provide case management.

== Program funding ==
Funds for Utah's HCBS waivers are appropriated by the state legislature every year. The Division Director and Director of the Department of Human Services are often heavily involved in advocating for the Division's funding needs. The legislature appropriates a portion of the state's Medicaid funds to DSPD. This state portion is then matched with federal funds by the Federal Medical Assistance Percentage (FMAP) — every $1 of state allocation is matched with $2.44 in federal Medicaid funds. DSPD's total operating budget has, despite slight fluctuation, increased steadily in recent years. In 2008, the total budget was $191,746,381. The 2013 fiscal year authorized budget was $215,316,800.

As of 2012, the Division served 4,985 Utahan's with disabilities. This included approximately 200 individuals who still lived in the Utah State Developmental Center. The services that each of these individuals receive differ based on their needs. There are many available service options. DSPD itself employs 120 people, most of whom are tasked with providing support to the private contractors who actually provide the direct support to program recipients.

== Collaborative relationships ==
DSPD often coordinates and collaborates with other state agencies to provide care for recipients of ID/RC HCBS waiver serves. Perhaps the strongest inter-agency partnership exists between the Division and the Division of Child and Family Services. These two state agencies often work together on crossover issues regarding their two respective populations. The most common crossover issue involves children who have experienced traumatic abuse or neglect and demonstrate extreme behavioral issues. Unfortunately, victims of acute abuse and neglect also experience significant developmental delays and thus qualify for services. In cases where these children have no other family or guardians, DSPD steps in to provide long-term care. Often, the child remains in the custody and guardianship of Child and Family Services. Division and Child and Family Services staff work closely together in these cases to ensure that services are administered appropriately and that the child is safe and healthy.

DSPD also works closely with many non-profit organizations to coordinate care and support to its clients. One such group is Utah's Center for Assistive Technology (UCAT). This organization provides the community with expertise and assistance regarding equipment and adaptations like wheelchairs, ramps, and alternative communication devices. Before approving extraordinary funding for equipment purchases, DSPD will refer clients to UCAT. This allows the Division to utilize UCAT's unique expertise to source the equipment from the community or assist them in pinpointing the exact need. This helps DSPD avoid misuse of taxpayer funds.

The most unusual non-profit agency that DPSD works with is People First, a self-advocacy organization for people with disabilities. This organization has many chapters in Utah. They help their members advocate for issues surrounding intellectual disabilities. The Division often includes People First members and leadership in stakeholder meetings. Together, they deliberate on how services are delivered and pertinent human rights issues. DSPD also encourages the private entities who deliver waiver services to include People First members' input on improvements.

The Utah Association of Community Services comprises over 40 companies. This association has worked closely with the Division to petition the legislature for funding in recent years. The independent Support Coordinators Association is an advocacy organization representing private caseworkers. This organization often works closely with DSPD on issues regarding how best to deliver services and coordinate oversight efforts between case managers and the Division.

== Program evaluation and research ==
The HCBS waiver program is still in its early stages. Therefore, research is not abundant or conclusive. The Center on Disability provided a statewide overview regarding waiting lists for HCBS waivers per state. Utah has approximately 2,355 persons on the Medicaid 1915c HCBS Waiver waiting list. This data was provided from one of the most recent survey results conducted in 2011. This chart is critical to demonstrate the unmet needs within the state of Utah; although the HCBS Waiver Program is fledgling in age when compared to other federal programs, there are significant waiting lists and an unmet need in a majority of states. The emphasis on Home and Community Based Services was initiated by a 1999 Supreme Court decision. This ruling created a significant change in prior policy in order for disabled individuals to receive care in non-institutional settings. Since 1999 the number of HCBS waivers has had a steady increase and demand by clients.

Some critical data on HCBS waivers comes from research done by the AARP Public Policy Institute, which has collected 38 studies regarding HCBS programs. The studies evaluated the cost effectiveness of HCBS programs versus institutional care. The studies compared a variety of state programs, and although Utah was not one of them, the data collected was valuable.

The overall core finding regarding the HCBS waiver program lacked concrete documentation to prove absolute cost savings when utilizing the HCBS system over the institutionalized one. Each state benefited from this study. Although evidentiary cost savings are unclear, the studies did consistently demonstrate lower per-individual, average costs for those placed on the HCBS programs.

One specific article from the University of Michigan dated back to 1997. This article focused on utilizing regression analysis by applying nursing home patients' length of stay, then estimated the co-efficient from this study to HCBS patients for their results. This study not only was dated, but could not run a complete analysis on actual HCBS patients only.

Another article dated from 2000 evaluated the HCBS waiver program. The main point of this study found that care in the community instead of institutionalized care resulted in a higher quality of care and improved quality of life at lower costs for those clients on a HDBS waiver. The study also stated that the effectiveness of HCBS waiver programs has not been rigorously evaluated to date.

A study was conducted in 2003 at Colorado's Traumatic Brain Injury Waiver Program. The analysis found that the waiver recipients had more case management, physical therapy, and group home services than the recipients in the control group. However, the results were inconclusive, as the study lacked adequate control, and significant differences between either groups were marginal.

The one tangible result that all the research continually focused on is that community-based services, such as those provided by the HCBS waiver programs, provided a higher quality of life for disabled individuals. It can also be argued that the research upholds the idea that the cost per individual was lower for those enrolled in the HCBS waiver program than for those attending institutions for similar services. The difficulty when collecting research and data for programs with fewer years of operation is concrete evidence for sufficient analysis. It is also critical to keep in mind that the HCBS waiver program varies state by state with regard to demographics, funding, state policies, and so forth. The most effective changes come as each state analyzes the overall functionality, success, and performance of their individual HCBS waiver program.

== Future ==
In recent years, DSPD has faced steep obstacles in its mission to care for Utahns with disabilities. The most acute and recent challenge involved funding issues which arose after the economic downturn of 2008. As state tax receipts fell in the months following the crisis, the legislature began making difficult decisions about how to fund state programs. The Division was asked to make do with a significant budget reduction. DSPD decided that the best way to reduce operational costs was to privatize casework. This allowed the Division to preserve critical services. By the end of 2009, all but a handful of caseworkers had transitioned from direct employment with the state to a private contractor. In both 2010 and 2011, the Division met additional budget shortfalls with staffing reductions, to avoid the reduction of critical services to waiver services recipients. It has been challenging for the Division to meet the same workload demands with less staff and resources.

In the future, DSPD will face the challenge of growing support for privatization. Voices within the state legislature have questioned the continued operation of the State Developmental Center with taxpayer funds. As it is more cost-effective to provide the same level of care in the community, the continued use of such institutions is a paradox. During recent economic hardships, the state legislature explored the possibility of privatizing the Developmental Center.
