= Civil rights in Utah =

Civil rights in the state of Utah are part of United States constitutional law. Rights are granted to individuals are determined on the national level through the 13th and 14th Amendments in the United States Constitution and each state has the power to integrate and enforce laws about civil rights in different ways in their state constitution. Social and religious standards have impacted civil rights in Utah and the Church of Jesus Christ of Latter-day Saints (LDS Church) has been a major influence on legislature.

Social and political movements involving groups and minorities such as women in the Feminist movement, Hispanics in the Chicano Movement, LGBT in the LGBTQ movement, and African Americans in the civil rights movement have lobbied for laws to protect these groups' rights, allowing them access to equal wages, jobs, education, housing, and the ability to vote.

== Women's civil rights ==
=== Voting ===
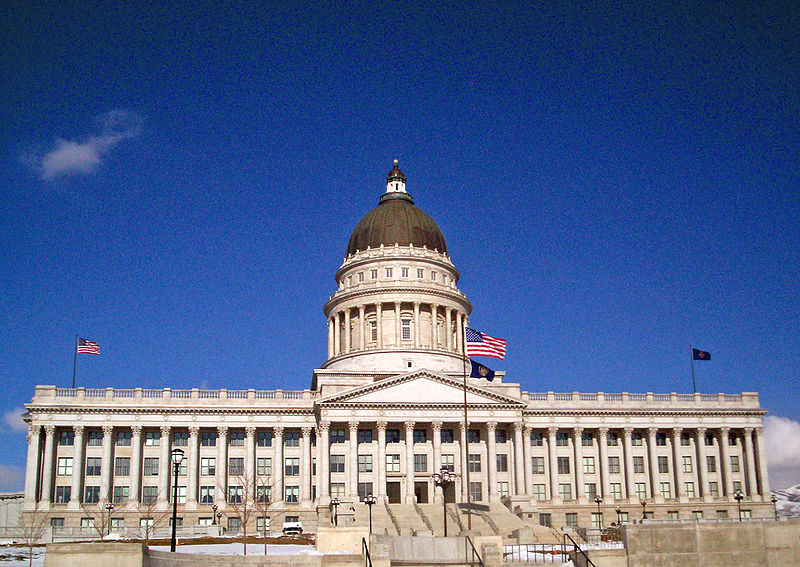
Utah State Capitol Building located in Salt Lake City, Utah.

Women gained the national right to vote in 1920. In Utah women were granted the right to vote in 1870, two decades before statehood was achieved. Sarah Young, the niece of Brigham Young, was the first woman to legally vote in the United States, due to a municipal election held on February 14, 1869 (Wyoming had recognized women's right to vote earlier that year, but had not yet held an election and the LDS Church had given women the right to vote). In 1887 Congress passed the Edmunds–Tucker Act, which was designed to limit some of the practices of the LDS Church such as polygamy. This disenfranchised women voters, who regained the right to vote when the Act was later revoked. Utah was also the first state to have a female State Senator, Martha Hughes Cannon.

=== Other rights ===
Utah has been criticized as one of the worst states for women's equality, as it has the largest gaps in wage and education attainment between men and women in the United States. It also ranked poorly in unemployment, political representation, and health and reproductive freedoms. The program Better Days 2020 was launched in the state in order to honor the history of women's suffrage in Utah and help improve the equality of women within the state.

== Hispanic civil rights ==
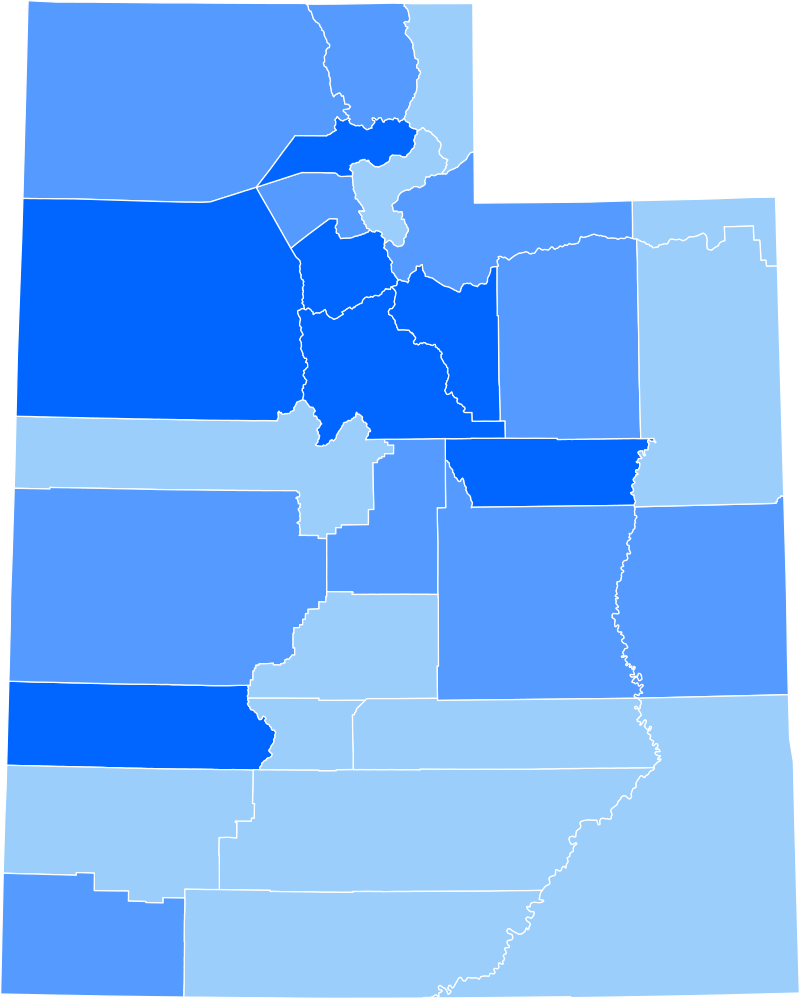
Hispanic population per county in Utah

=== Settlement ===
In the early 1900s the first Hispanic settlement was established in Monticello in the Southeast part of Utah. More Hispanic establishments were started in other parts of Utah where they worked on cattle and sheep farms, railroads, and in coal mines. Eventually Hispanics became the largest minority, and played a role during the civil rights movement. In 1958, Spanish-speaking Organization for Community Integrity and Opportunity, SOCIO was created to fight for the rights of Hispanics in Utah. Its purpose was to unify members of Hispanic communities from across Utah and promote equality and respect for their race.

=== Statistics ===
Latinos make up 21% of the entire United States population. In Utah, the Latino community is a minority, but they are the largest minority in the state, making up approximately 14% of the state population. While they are the largest minority group, they are not spread out evenly throughout the state, which is evident when looking at school districts. Provo City School District is approximately 24% Latino while Nebo and Alpine Districts are around 12%. This correlates to the fact that the Provo City School District population is 41% economically disadvantaged while Nebo and Alpine Districts are around 20% economically disadvantaged. Most Latinos are living in Utah county, many are beginning to move out due to increasing housing prices. Housing for Latinos is a problem in Utah because of the language barrier. Many Latinos moving to Utah are taken advantage of from landlords because they do not have connections to help them or speak the same language. There is a pattern of landlords raising rent, causing Latinos to leave because they cannot afford rent . Utah has Circle Programs in place to help the Latino community with financial stability and food. Circle Programs are community based programs whose purpose is to help individuals and families gain resources help needed to be successful.

== LGBTQ civil rights ==
=== Previous Issues of LGBTQ in Utah ===
The LGBTQ community has been present in Utah since before the case of Equality Utah v. Utah State Board of Education. In this case, students fought against the State of Utah for discriminating and banning positive conversations regarding LGBTQ students in public schools.

Since the beginning of the State of Utah, there has been a strong Latter-day Saint influence in the legislation. This influence was shown through the different laws set in place for the State of Utah. In 1851, a person of the male gender was not allowed to have sexual intercourse with another man. Resulting in the ban of homosexual behavior. Up until 1969, it was a felony to practice sodomy. It was in 1969 when the charges of sodomy got reduced to a misdemeanor.

=== Discrimination ===
The LGBTQ community faces many challenges living in Utah. Same-sex marriage was not made legal in the state until 2014. Because of the legalization, same-sex couples were granted the same benefits as other married couples. In 2013, same-sex couples were allowed to adopt or have a surrogate mother in order to have children. From the controversy of legalizing same-sex marriage in Utah, state legislature passed a law banning discrimination against gender identity and sexual orientation in the workplace and through housing.

== African American civil rights ==
=== Effects of Civil Right Movement ===
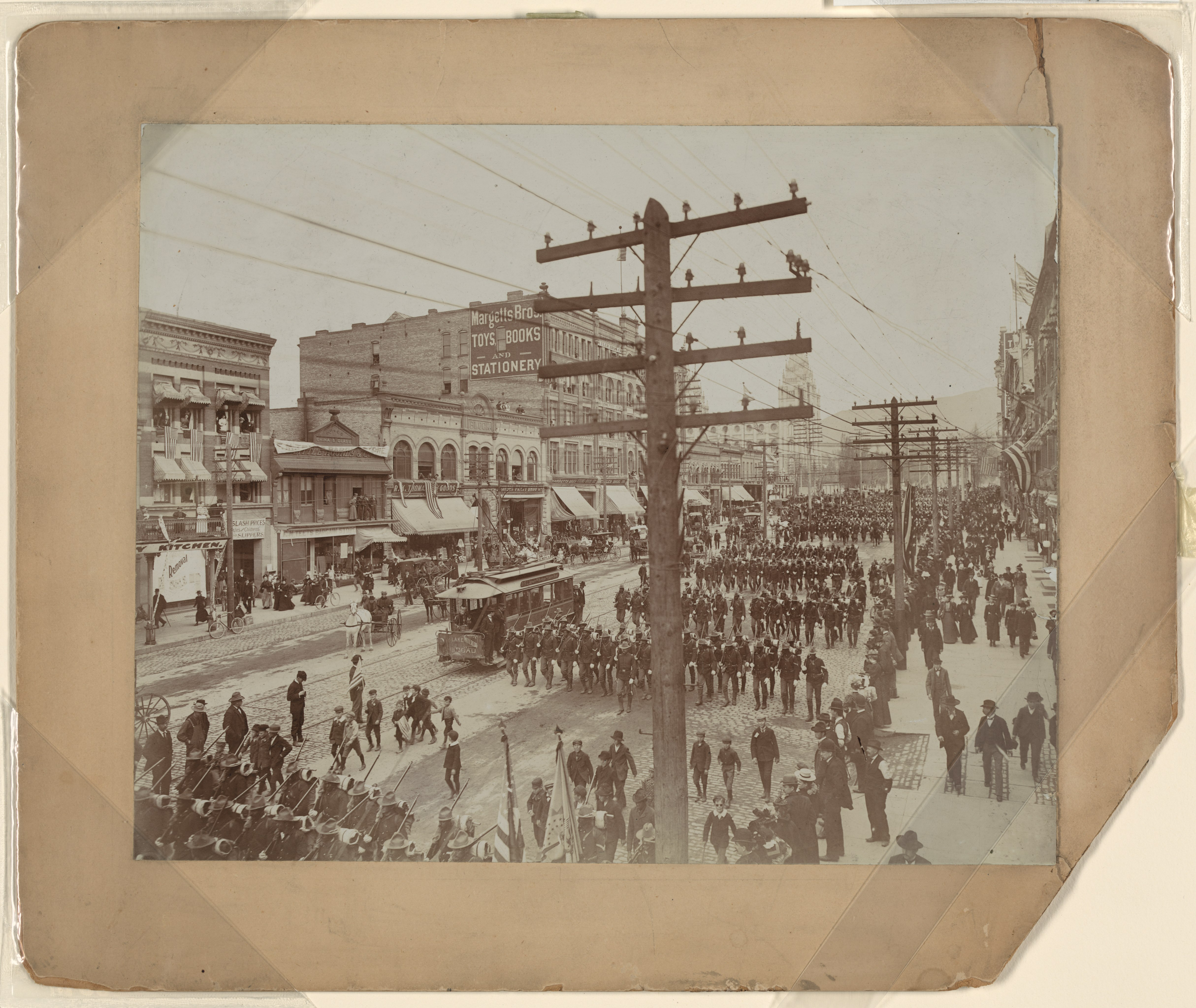
The 24th Infantry consisted of both White and African American men, left Salt Lake City for Chattanooga, TN.

The era of the civil rights movement in 1950 brought change to Utah and the African Americans living there. Many African Americans faced discrimination as they came to Utah, however as public attractions such as Lagoon Amusement Park started to appear segregation began to disappear. In Utah today, most of the African American population and other minorities living on the west side of the Salt Lake area.
