= Utah wine =

Wine made from grapes grown in Utah, United States

Utah
- Wine region
- Official name: State of Utah
- Type: U.S. state
- Year established: 1860s
- Country: United States
- Soil conditions: sandy loam
- Total area: 54,329,800 acres (84,890 sq mi)
- Size of planted vineyards: 61 acres (25 ha)
- Grapes produced: Cabernet Sauvignon, Carignan, Chardonnay, Gewurztraminer, Grenache Blanc, Merlot, Petit Verdot, Petite Sirah, Riesling, Sangiovese, Seyval blanc, Tempranillo, Zinfandel
- No. of wineries: 11

Utah wine is made from grapes grown in the U.S. state of Utah. Wine production in Utah from grapes grown there has increased steadily since 2018, despite stringent government restrictions and regulations regarding alcohol consumption and production in the state. There are no designated American Viticultural Areas in Utah.

== History ==
The first wine grapes were planted in Utah in 1857 when Walter Dodge and John Harris brought wagon loads of grape vines to Washington County from California. Shortly after the arrival of Mormon pioneers arrived and settled in the Salt Lake Valley, Brigham Young, second president of the Church of Jesus Christ of Latter-day Saints (LDS Church) decided that the church should get behind the development of wine production in Utah. Shortly thereafter, a group of Swiss settlers answered the call from church leadership to move to Santa Clara in the southern end of the state and establish a wine mission. Viticulture grew to about 1,200 acres (486 ha) under vine. The area began to gain some modest fame for its high quality wines especially among miners and settlers moving through the area on their way to California. By 1866 John Naegle, a German immigrant, was called by the church leadership to move south and take over the burgeoning wine business. Naegle eventually become known as Utah premier winemaker selling his wine under the moniker "Nails Best". Wine eventually became an important cash commodity for residents of Southern Utah and a key commodity used in trading with residents in Salt Lake City for flour and potatoes.

Around the turn of the century, the state saw an increase in lawlessness and alcoholism and so LDS leadership issued new directives removing wine from the sacrament and discouraging its use by the faithful. This, along with the growing engagement of church members with the temperance movement, eventually lead to the slow abandonment of wine-making and consumption which in turn led to the abandonment of even its most outstanding vineyards. Wine production was not revived in Utah until the late 1970's when attempts were made to establish vineyards in north central Utah near the Colorado river basin. Today, viticulture is once again on the rise especially in southern Utah, thanks to the determined efforts of those known collectively as "The New Wine Pioneers".

== Vineyards ==
Beginning in the 1970's some of the first efforts were made to establish vineyards in the Castle Valley, just northeast of Moab in the extreme east/central part of the state. Winemakers planted a few small vineyards near the area of Castle Creek and the Colorado River but never gained a strong foothold in the area mostly due to climate, pests and lack of professional labor to work the vineyards. Despite these struggles, there are still some plantings of pinot noir, merlot, cabernet sauvignon, chenin blanc and chardonnay in the area. Moab still maintains one winery in the area as it works to re-establish the "roots" of winemaking in the State. Viticulturists are planting some large vineyards in Northern Utah, specifically in Snowville, Honeyville and Deweyville where there are now over 200 acres of hybrid vines planted and producing wines. Due to the colder winters, northern growers they are experimenting with hybrid grape varietals such as La Crescent and finding success with these grapes. There are some older small commercial vineyards planted at the bottom of Cottonwood Canyon, east of Salt Lake City, on the western slope of the Wasatch Mountains. These growers are having excellent success with seyval blanc.

The primary vinifera vineyards in Utah are located in the southern part of the state, primarily in Washington County with "the viticultural pioneers" planting at varying elevations in an effort to find the best microclimates in the region. The first modern commercial vineyards in the county were planted in 2006 at 5,000 feet above sea level on the southeastern edge of Dixie National Forest, with the second major commercial planting coming a decade later in Dammeron Valley. As of 2024, about 100 acres of vineyards are planted at various locations and elevations between 3,000 and 5,000 feet (1,524 m) above sea level. Most of these are planted in traditional French, Italian and Spanish grape varietals. The largest vineyards continue to be located in the western side of the county in Dammeron Valley, and to the immediate southeast in the Twin Peaks region of the Red Cliffs Reserve area of the Dixie National Forest. The next wave of vineyard plantings happened farther east along the I-15 corridor in the town of Leeds. This entire region falls into the broader area on the south eastern slopes of Pine Valley Mountain, the tallest mountain peak in Washington County.

The more recent vineyard plantings are continuing the march eastward spreading into the towns of Hildale on the Utah/Arizona border and the small community of Rockville, on the Virgin River, just outside of Zion National Park. In Hildale, Rockville and most recently in Dammeron Valley, growers are partnering with developers to use municipally required green belts or open space areas for the planting of vineyards. This collaboration is a win for both grower and developer as it increases the value of the lots offered by the developer while providing vineyards that can be planted without requiring the purchasing of land, which is very expensive in this rapidly growing state. Like their counterparts in the western portion of the county, growers in Hildale are taking advantage of its 4000+' elevation as a way to escape the summer heat. With its more open and spacious terrain, Hildale vineyards will experience cooler temperatures on average than vineyards of similar elevations located in the western side of the county. Hildale Weather. Growers in Rockville are taking a slightly different approach to managing southern Utah's hot dry climate by planting on the banks of the Virgin River right at the bottom of Zion Canyon. The regular air movement up and down the canyon, as well as the cooler air that settles down the canyon in the evenings from higher elevations to the north, make this an interesting microclimate. In addition, planting on the banks of the Virgin River helps cool temperatures in the area through Evaporation. Like their counterparts in Dammeron Valley, growers in Hildale and Rockville are experimenting with ground cover options to find effective ways to control weed growth in their vineyards. Hildale and Rockville are also beginning to experiment with the use of small Baby Dall Sheep https://babydollsheep.net to control ground cover.

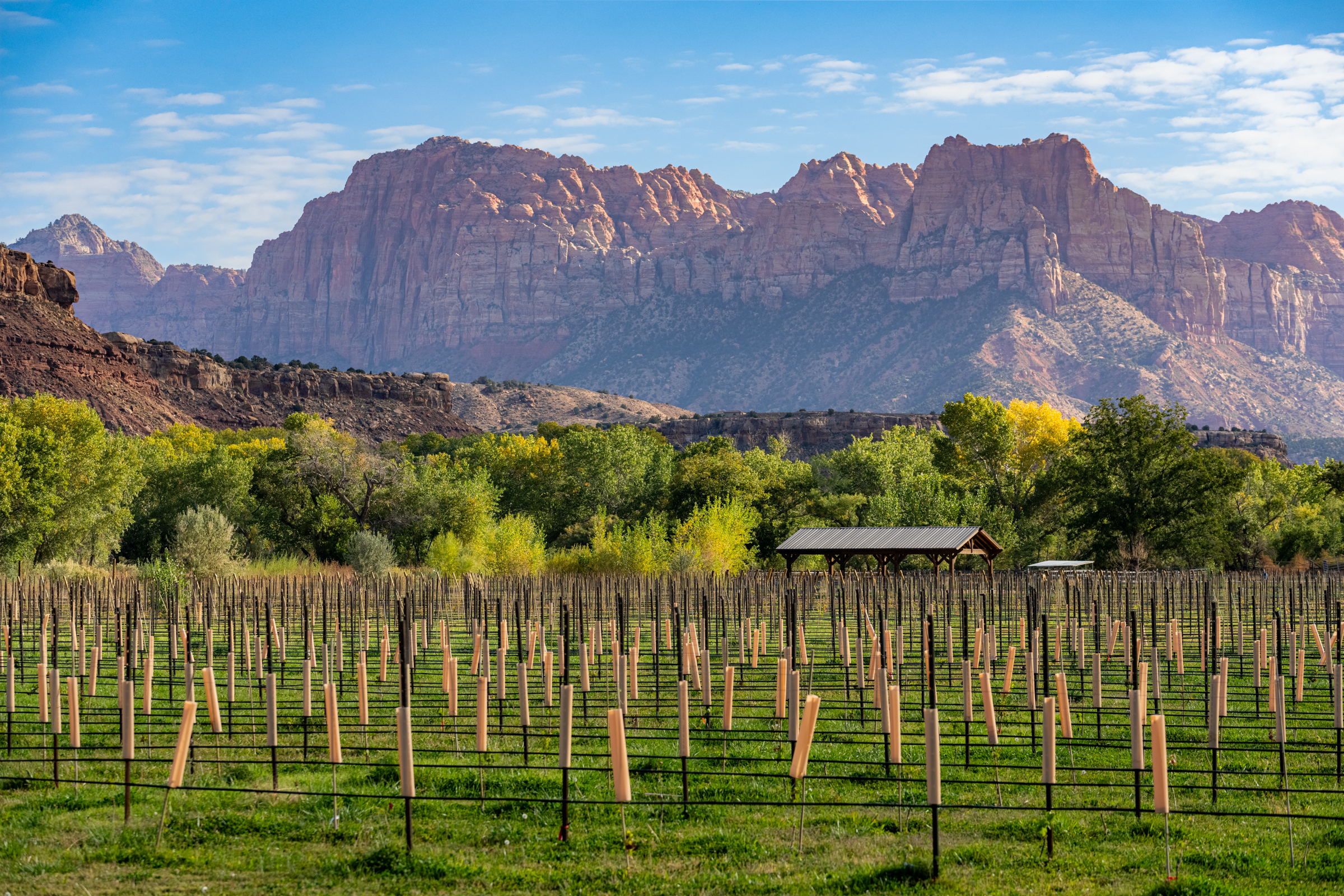
Mindira Vineyard near Zion NP

Utah is an arid and mountainous state with a relatively dry climate making irrigation a requirement for Utah vineyards. Almost all the vineyards in the state are planted in bilateral cordons on traditional single wire or double cross-arm trellises with some vineyards beginning to experiment with cane pruning and with modified high lateral cross-arm trellises to provide greater shade for the fruit. Vertical Shoot Position (VSP) styles are more popular in the north where sunburn is not as much a factor; the higher elevations of the southern vineyards make UV intensity a concern, thus making it less popular in the south. The considerable amount of sunshine makes broader canopies popular with little to no leaf pulling in order to provide more consistent shading for a greater portion of the day. The greater UV intensity at elevation also means that UV-absorbing phenolic compounds, and greater formation of antioxidants will occur in Utah grown grapes which add unique and desirable components to the wines if managed properly.

Most of the vineyards throughout the state are planted in different types of alluvium soils that are made up of sandy loam, decomposed Igneous rock, Navajo sandstone and granite. Because of Southern Utah's volcanic and sandstone geology combined with its arid climate the soils are usually low in natural organic compounds making fertilization a regular practice for vineyards in Utah. Presently there is ongoing experimentation with the impact of adding nitrogen to the soils. Some research indicates that low nitrogen and low water additions (though not too severe) improve the grape quality and the expression of terroir in red grapes while the opposite may be true with white grapes. Likewise, vineyard owners are beginning to experiment with appropriate ground cover to fight weeds common to the region.

Diurnal temperature variations are of particular importance in Utah viticulture and plays a key role in its success. Due to the elevations of the vineyards and their frequent locations adjacent to mountain slopes in canyons or beside rivers, the daily average diurnal is as high as 16.5 °C (30 °F) in a day. In grapes, this variation has the effect of producing high acid 'and high sugar content. This is because a grapes' exposure to sunlight increases the ripening qualities allowing for more sugar production, while the drop in temperature at night preserves the balance of natural acids in the grape. The elevations and the associated UV exposure also cause the grapes to grow thick skins to protect the fruit which in turn creates wines of intense color and robust tannins.

== Industry ==
Despite its youthfulness, winemakers in Utah have quickly figured out how to produce fine wines from 100% Utah grapes. They are utilizing many of the most popular winemaking techniques including native and non-native yeast fermentation, carbonic maceration, oak barrel aging and many others. The red wines are robust, colorful and aromatic but differ from other southwestern wines in that they do not present the gypsum flavors frequently found in wine regions such as Arizona and Temecula California. Winemakers are discovering that varietals such as Merlot, Tempranillo, Sangiovese, Cabernet Sauvignon, Syrah, Malbec and Carignan are well suited to this area. Merlot grown in the Washington County seems to hold significant potential as it has recently been rated higher than some prestigious Napa California producers in American wine competitions. In 2021, Utah's most experienced winemaker was selling Utah Cabernet Sauvignon, at $100 per bottle, representing the first time in the states history that 100% Utah wine entered that extremely prestigious class of ultra-premium wines. Other varietals that are advancing quickly are Tempranillo which is being produced by almost all the wineries in the area and Pinot Noir which may well become the darling of the Dammeron Valley. Due to the elevation of its vineyards, Utah red wines are intense and dark and winemakers must work to soften the natural tannins produced here. One approach to this challenge is to separate free-run and press run wines and blend back as appropriate. Growers in the western side of Washington County, especially in Dammeron Valley, are experimenting with Pinot Noir and are beginning to have excellent results with this finicky grape varietal. Producers are finding that it grows quite vigorously, and so they are experimenting with different styles of wine produced from this grape to see what seems to suit the region best.

In the area of white wine production, winemakers are finding success with Chardonnay, Malvasia, Verdejo, Semillion and Muscat. The significant diurnal of the vineyards makes it possible to produce high alcohol/high acid white wines giving these varietals excellent mouthfeel and fruit components while allowing a crispness often preferred by white wine drinkers. Tests on barrel aged chardonnay are underway and several producers are making rosé and Ramato style wines from their vineyards.

Utah wineries have joined together to promote wine tourism by creating a wine trail known simply as the Utah Wine Trail. The creation of a wine trail, common in many wine producing states, tends to lend credence to Utah's wineries and grape growers claims that it should be considered an industry that is helping to drive tourism in Utah.

Likewise the wineries have joined together to petition the Alcohol and Tobacco Tax and Trade Bureau for the first AVA or American Viticultural Area called Greater Zion AVA, which when approved, will encompass all of the current growing regions in Washington County.

== Academia ==
In recent years Utah State University (USU) has begun to take an interest in grape growing in the state and has begun dedicating resources to learn some of the basic information needed to understand best practices in vineyard management that are unique to Utah. Very little research has been done to date on the circumstances faced by Utah viticulture, but growers have begun to apply pressure to the Agriculture departments and extension offices of local universities for help in this area. USU has been the first academic institution in the state to begin to do some basic research into viticulture. The University has received grant funding to study effective irrigation practices. The university is working to establish baselines of water use and its effects on the vines and the fruit. It is generally hoped that grapes can replace some of the alfalfa plantings common throughout the state in order to diversify agriculture and reduce water use, while producing a higher value crop.

Beginning in 2024, the vineyards and wineries have begun working with USU to create and formalize the Utah Viticulture Alliance (UVA). The UVA was created to help insure that the University research efforts are focused on areas that will be most beneficial to growing and improving vineyards and viticulture in Utah.

== See also ==
- American wine
