= Five Mile Pass =

Region in Utah, United States

Five Mile Pass, Utah
- Coordinates: 40°16′0″N 112°5′0″W

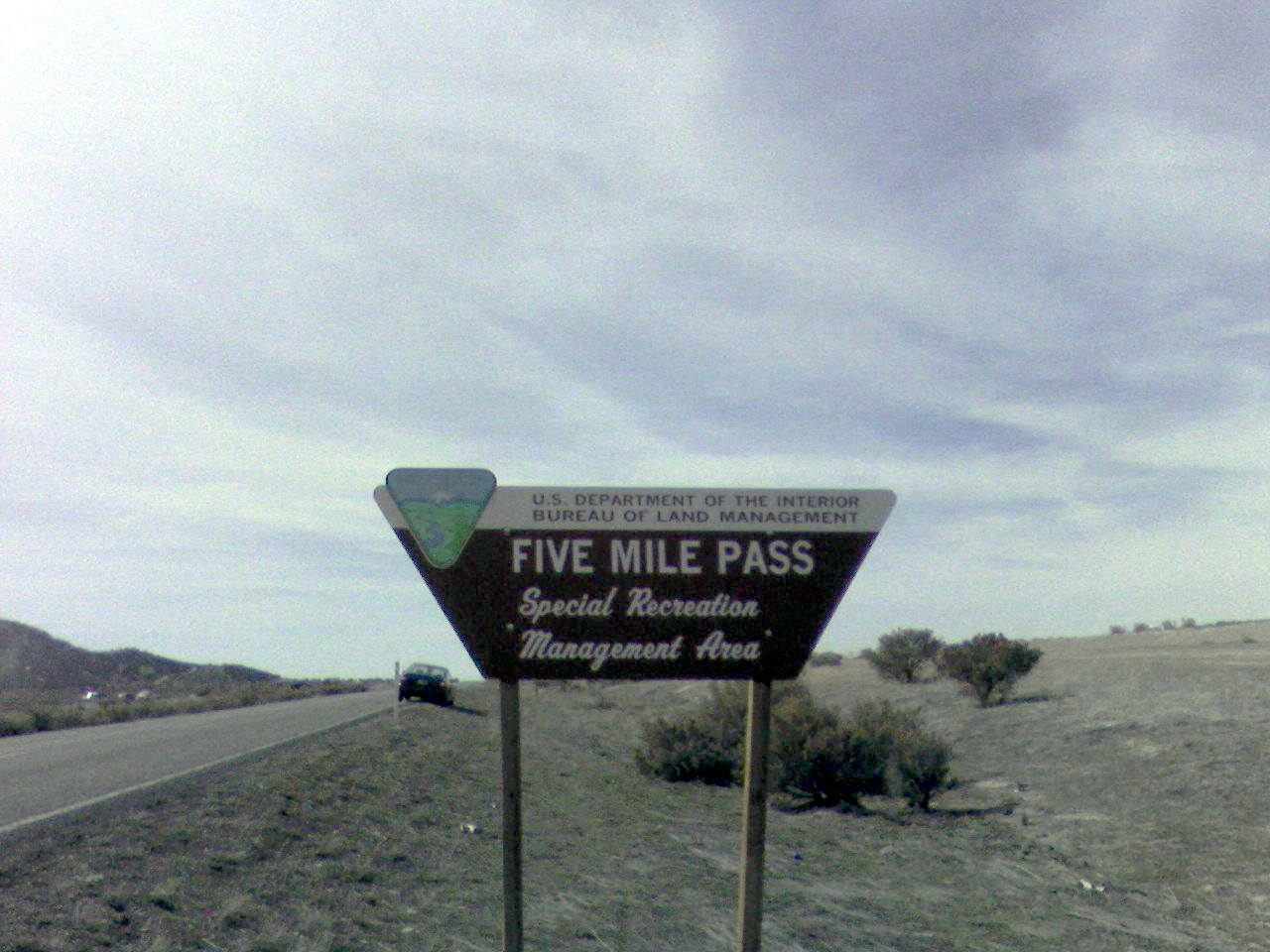
Five Mile Pass entry sign.

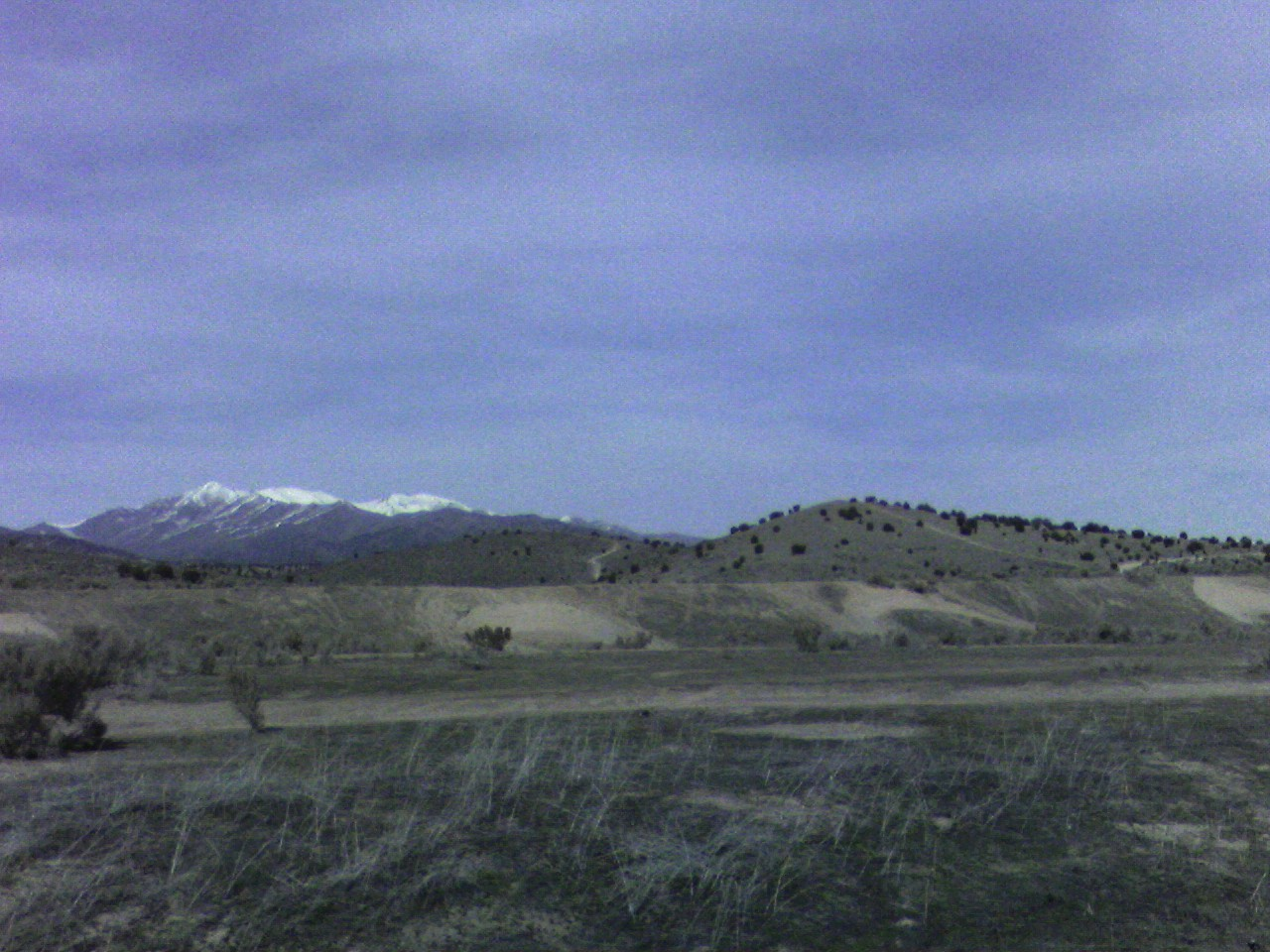
Motocross biking trails at Five Mile Pass, Utah.

Five Mile Pass is a high arid region ~14 miles (23 km) west of Eagle Mountain, Utah, that is managed by the Bureau of Land Management and is popular for motocross, off highway vehicle recreation, mountain biking, hiking, and camping.

The area is on the Utah County and Tooele County line, and the Pony Express passed through the area during 1860-1861. The area also was traveled by the stagecoach and pioneer families heading west for Nevada and California. Other historical activities in the area include mineral mining and quarrying.
