= Tim Cosgrove =

American politician (born 1965)

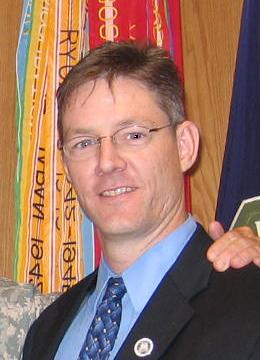

Member of the Utah House of Representatives from the 44th district
- In office January 1, 2005 – December 31, 2014
- Succeeded by: Bruce R. Cutler

Personal details
- Born: November 26, 1965 (age 60)
- Party: Democratic Party
- Spouse: Diane Bolingbroke (divorced)
- Education: Weber State University; George Washington University
- Occupation: Community Liaison for Salt Lake County

Timothy Michael Cosgrove (born November 26, 1965) is a former Democratic member of the Utah State House of Representatives, representing the 44th District from 2005 through 2014.

== Early life and career ==
Born November 26, 1965, Cosgrove is a graduate of Weber State University with a Bachelor of Science degree in political science. He then earned his Master of Arts in Political Management from George Washington University. He currently lives in Taylorsville, Utah and works as a Community Liaison for Salt Lake County.

== Political career ==
Representative Cosgrove was first elected to the Utah State Legislature in 2004 and has served continuously since then. In March 2014 he announced that he would not seek re-election.

His committee assignments as a legislator include Public Education Appropriations Subcommittee; House Transportation Committee; House Revenue and Taxation Committee; House Ethics Committee.

== 2014 Sponsored Legislation ==
| Bill number | Bill title | Status |
|---|---|---|
| HB0032 | College Credit for Veterans | Governor Signed - 3/31/2014 |
| HB0108S01 | Mobile Home Park Task Force | House/ filed - 3/13/2014 |
| HB0313S02 | Veterans' and Military Affairs Commission | Governor Signed - 3/29/2014 |
| HB0406S01 | School Bus Traffic Safety Amendments | House/ filed - 3/13/2014 |
| HB0428 | Veteran Benefit Assistance Disclosure | House/ filed - 3/13/2014 |

Representative Cosgrove floor sponsored an additional two bills during the 2014 General Session.

== Affiliations ==
His affiliations include:

- Child Advocate of the Year (2003), Prevent Child Abuse Utah
- Outstanding Efforts Promoting Child Health and Safety (2001), Utah Nurses Association
- Outstanding Legislative Efforts to Save Lives (2000), Utah Department of Health Bureau of Emergency Medical Services
- Utah State PTA Health Commissioner (2001–2004)
- Utah State PTA Legislative Action Committee (2000–2004).
