= Children's Service Society =

Children's Service Society is the oldest non-denominational child and family support agency in Utah. Organized in 1884 as the Orphan’s Home and Day Nursery Association, the society's purpose was to help destitute, neglected, and orphaned children, and to assist working mothers. The name was changed to Children's Service Society of Utah in October 1927 to better reflect the foster care services that the agency provided for over 60 years.
