= Utah Venture Capital Enhancement Act =

The Utah Venture Capital Enhancement Act is a bill passed by the Utah State Legislature in 2003. The purpose of the bill was to increase the amount and diversity of capital funding available to high growth, early stage companies in the state of Utah. Rather than invest directly in these companies, the program is structured to give incentive to high quality professional venture capital and private equity firms, both in and out of the state, to focus more of their investment efforts on Utah entrepreneurs. The Utah Venture Capital Enhancement Act managing director and team evaluates quality venture firms with the assistance of the program's professional investment advisor. Venture funds that receive Utah Venture Capital Enhancement Act investment dollars commit to work closely with Utah companies and entrepreneurs – with the goal of funding promising deals in the state. The Utah Venture Capital Enhancement Act does not require portfolio funds to open a Utah office or commit to invest specific dollar amounts in Utah companies. Rather, the Venture Capital Enhancement Act requires a commitment by funds' senior management to spend considerable time in Utah meeting with companies in the state.

The Utah Venture Capital Enhancement Act was passed in 2003 in the form of Utah House Bill 240 ("HB 240"). An unfunded legislative workgroup crafted the legislation led by Representative Peggy Wallace, the Utah Information Technology Association (now the Utah Technology Council), economic development leaders, and entrepreneurs. The legislation surprised many observers by passing overwhelmingly through both the Senate and the House in its first year.

In late 2003, Utah's Department of Economic Development (now the Governors Office of Economic Development) hired Jeremy Neilson to establish and launch the Utah Fund of Funds program. Neilson along with two volunteer boards were charged with implementing the legislation. Neilson set up the Utah Capital Investment Corporation (UCIC) and quickly became that entity's only employee, overseen by the Utah Capital Investment Corporation board of directors. After legislative tweaks, validating lawsuit, RFP's, financing and more, Neilson launched the Utah FoF on January 26, 2006, to a standing room only launching event.

Under Neilson's leadership, the Utah FoF became the nation's most successful contingent tax credit private equity program and arguably one of the most successful state supported private equity program in the nation. Neilson was the sole manager and sole strategist for the Utah FoF for over six years. At the time Neilson left the Utah FoF, the program had invested in 28 venture capital and private equity funds, in Utah, throughout the US, and even internationally. The Utah FoF had assisted in the creation of over 3,400 jobs with the average salary of $60,000+ that resulting in over $60 M of annual Utah tax revenue. The Utah FoF had a robust matching service that resulted in hundreds of Utah-based businesses getting access to hundreds of venture capital and private equity professionals throughout the world. However, a 2014 audit by the Utah State Legislature's Office of the Auditor General challenged the veracity of these claims. It also clarified that during Neilson's leadership, the UCIC awarded $330,000 in bonuses without any documented merit.

== Financing ==
The Utah Venture Capital Enhancement Act's $120M financing was provided by a third party, and is backed by refundable, transferable, contingent State of Utah tax credits approved by the Utah Legislature. In 2008, the fund was expanded to $300 Million. The program is structured to be financially self-sustaining, with profits from Utah Venture Capital Enhancement Act investments paying back financers. Only in the case of a shortfall would the state be required to place tax credit funds into the Utah Venture Capital Enhancement Act. The 2014 audit highlighted that the Utah FoF's unusually high financing costs were greater negating all investment gains.

== Structure ==
The Utah Venture Capital Enhancement Act is governed by two boards that oversee and report on the fund's activities. The Utah Venture Capital Enhancement Act managing director directs the fund, with support from a professional investment advisor firm.

== Success ==
The 2014 audit reported when reporting its success, the economic reports produced by the Utah FoF contained substantial inconsistencies and inconsistent methodology that has led the Utah FoF to overstate its economic impact. The Utah FoF returned all of the funds it borrowed, didn't cash any tax credits and returned enough capital to launch a small venture fund focused on funding the next generation of Utah startups.
