= Utah Division of Services for People with Disabilities =

U.S. state government program

The Utah Division of Services for People with Disabilities (DSPD) is a Utah state government program designed to give support to individuals with disabilities.

== Mission ==
DSPD's stated mission is "to promote opportunities and provide supports for persons with disabilities to lead self-determined lives." To accomplish this mission, DSPD has outlined six goals:

1. Promote and recognize excellence
2. Continue a person-centered philosophy
3. Promote public awareness of disability issues
4. Work collaboratively to dissolve barriers to quality service
5. Support a full spectrum of service options
6. Support self-determination by assisting persons to exercise and develop their ability to make choices and to experience:
  - Freedom to make informed choices from among available options of services and support
  - Authority to control a defined amount of dollars to purchase only what is needed and valued
  - Support to nurture informal relationships that might augment, if not replace, some purchased services
  - Responsibility to give back to the community

== Services ==
DSPD provides support for people with disabilities in many different categories. These can include, but are not limited to:

1. Behavior supports
2. Companion services
3. Financial management services
4. Professional parent supports (e.g., group homes)
5. Respite care
6. Supported employment
7. Transportation services

== Eligibility ==
Persons eligible for these services have qualifying disabilities in one of four areas:

1. Intellectual disabilities or related conditions
2. Acquired brain injury
3. Physical disabilities
4. Autism

The majority of services are outsourced to Private Contractors, however the DSPD also manages the Utah State Developmental Center (USDC). The USDC, an intermediate care facility for people with intellectual disabilities, provides services in recreation, psychology, social work, and work programs. This 24-hour facility is primarily for people with more severe intellectual disabilities and is focused on active treatment and vocational programs.

== History ==
The Utah Division of Health established the Office of Handicapped Services in 1979. Four years later, the Department of Social Services merged that office with the Department of Developmental Disabilities and Mental Retardation to form the currently named Division of Services for People With Disabilities.

For the next 34 years, major changes occurred in DSPD in the form of waivers and legislation. These changes and a brief description are listed below:

1. Waiver Authority (1981) – allows the agency to provide community-based programs instead of institutions and still be in compliance with federal statutory requirements.
2. Community Supports Waiver (1986) – allows the agency to provide home and community-based services at home and not just in institutions.
3. Acquired Brain Injury Waiver (1995) – allows the agency to provide home and community-based services for people with an acquired brain injury.
4. Physical Disability Waiver (1998) – allows the agency to provide home and community-based services for people with physical disabilities.
5. Lisa P. v. Angus (1993) – a lawsuit filed seeking community placement in "least restrictive and most enabling environment" for residents of the USDC.
6. Portability of Funding for Health and Human Services (1998) – legislation enables individuals with disabilities to receive funding to move them out of institutions and into the community.
7. Olmstead v. L.C. (1999) – the outcome led to the removal of many individuals with disabilities from institutional settings to community-based programs.
