= Kenneth W. Sumsion =

American politician

Member of the Utah House of Representatives from the 56th district
- In office 2007–2013

Personal details
- Party: Republican
- Education: Brigham Young University
- Occupation: Politician

Kenneth W. Sumsion is a former Republican member of the Utah House of Representatives who represented district 56, based in American Fork, from 2007 to 2013. He was one of the sponsors of a 2009 bill in the Utah legislature to ban most abortion cases. Sumsion was a candidate in the Utah gubernatorial election, 2012, challenging incumbent Republican Gary Herbert.

Sumsion was elected to the state legislature in 2006. He won the Republican nomination for his district after defeating incumbent David Cox at the state Republican convention the same year.

Sumsion served as chairman of the Redistricting Committee. He was involved in a minor controversy when a Utah newspaper used an open records request to obtain emails from Sumsion to Governor Herbert asking if he would veto a proposed redistricting bill. The email exchange implied that Herbert would veto the bill, which he publicly denied.

Sumsion is a graduate of Brigham Young University and is a California licensed Certified Public Accountant since 1993. He resides in American Fork, Utah.

== Sources ==
- Deseret News, Sep. 19, 2009
- Medical News article on progress of the abortion ban bill in Utah
