= Deseret (Book of Mormon) =

Term found in the Book of Mormon

Deseret (/dɛzəˈrɛt/; Deseret: 𐐔𐐯𐑅𐐨𐑉𐐯𐐻) is a term derived from the Book of Mormon, a scripture of the Church of Jesus Christ of Latter-day Saints (LDS Church) and other Latter Day Saint groups. According to the Book of Mormon, "deseret" meant "honeybee" in the language of the Jaredites, a group in the Book of Mormon that were led by God to the Americas after the construction of the Tower of Babel (see Ether 2:3). Latter-day Saint scholar Hugh Nibley (extending the work of Egyptologist Sir Alan Gardiner) suggested an etymology by associating the word "Deseret" with the ancient Egyptian deshret, (Note: Egyptian hieroglyphs: d S r t S3) a term he translated as the "bee crown" of the Lower Kingdom, but which non-LDS scholarly sources translate as the "Red Crown".

== Proposed State of Deseret ==
The provisional 1849 boundaries of the State of Deseret, named after the word for honeybees in the Book of Mormon. The proposed boundary of Deseret is the dotted line, while the Utah Territory is blue and outlined in black; boundaries are not exact.

Deseret was proposed as a name for the U.S. state of Utah. Brigham Young—governor of Utah Territory from 1851 to 1858 and president of the LDS Church from 1847 to 1877—favored the name as a symbol of industry. Young taught that Church members should be productive and self-sufficient, a trait he had perceived in honeybees.

The Mormons petitioned for statehood as the State of Deseret during 1849–50, but the petition was rejected by the U.S. Congress because of the vast size of the relatively unpopulated area that was controlled by the LDS Church. Instead, the federal government created Utah Territory.

Some vestiges of the name survive. For example, the state symbol of Utah is a beehive; this emblem is represented on the state seal, state flag, and marker shields for state highways. The state nickname is the "Beehive State" and the honeybee is Utah's official "state insect". The Salt Lake Bees are a minor league baseball team representing Utah in the Pacific Coast League. Named after the original Salt Lake Bees (PCL, 1915–26), they were formerly known as the Buzz (1994–2000) and the Stingers (2001–05). "Deseret" appears twice on the Utah stone located on the 220-foot (67 m) landing of the Washington Monument.

== Other uses ==
Various businesses and organizations use "Deseret" as part of their name, particularly those that have connections to the LDS Church. Examples include:

- Deseret alphabet — a non-Latin phonetic alphabet developed during the mid-19th century by the board of regents of the University of Deseret (University of Utah) as directed by Brigham Young
- Deseret Book — the world's largest LDS bookstore chain
- Deseret First Credit Union — formerly known as the LDS Church Employees Credit Union
- Deseret Industries — a Utah-based thrift store
- Deseret Nation — an alt-right Twitter grouping of LDS Church members
- Deseret News — Utah's second-largest daily newspaper
- Deseret Ranch — a large cattle ranch in Florida, United States
- Deseret, Utah — a village
