= List of Utah state symbols =

Location of the state of Utah in the United States of America

The U.S. state of Utah has 27 official symbols, as designated by the Utah State Legislature, and three unofficial symbols. All official symbols, except the Great Seal, are listed in Title 63G of Utah Code. In 1896, Utah became a state, and on April 3 the Utah legislature, in its first regular session, adopted its first symbol, the Great Seal of the State of Utah.

Many unique symbols of Utah are related to Utah's pioneer heritage, such as the California gull, the beehive, the dutch oven and the Sego Lily. Utah has symbols that are used by multiple states. For example, the honey bee, Utah's state insect, is also a symbol of Arkansas, Georgia, Kansas, Louisiana, Maine, Mississippi, Missouri, Nebraska, New Jersey, North Carolina, West Virginia and Wisconsin.

== Official state symbols ==
Type	Symbol	Description	Adopted	Image	Source
Animal	Rocky Mountain elk Cervus canadensis nelsoni	Once found over most of the United States and Canada, elk herds have been decimated by hunting and habitat loss. Now, elk are only found in the Rocky Mountains. State owned Hardware Ranch provides feed for 600 elk every winter.	1971		
Astronomical symbol	Beehive Cluster	The Beehive Cluster is an open cluster of about 1,000 stars and is located in the constellation Cancer. It was named the state's astronomical symbol due to having the same name as the state's emblem and nickname.	1996		
Bird	California gull Larus californicus	Named the state bird in commemoration of the "miracle of the gulls". In 1848, the pioneers were tending to their first harvest since they arrived in Utah, when Mormon crickets swarmed in and started to devour the crops. California gulls came in and ate the crickets, thus saving the crops.	1955		
Emblem	Beehive	The beehive symbolizes industry, which is the state's motto. Before the state of Utah, the provisional government of the State of Deseret also had the beehive as its emblem. Deseret means honeybee in the Book of Mormon. The first bees brought to modern-day Utah were allegedly carried by Charles Crismon from the Mormon colony in San Bernardino, California.	1959		
Cooking Pot	Dutch oven	Dutch ovens were the primary cooking vessels of pioneers. The World Championship Dutch Oven Cookoff is held every summer near Logan, Utah.	1997		
Crustacean	Brine shrimp Artemia franciscana	Brine shrimp are widely found in the Great Salt Lake. They are the primary food source for migratory birds that fly over the lake throughout the year.	2023		
Fish	Bonneville cutthroat trout Oncorhynchus clarki Utah	In 1997, the state fish became the Bonneville cutthroat trout replacing the Rainbow Trout, which had been the state fish since 1971. The Bonneville cutthroat trout is a native species to Utah, unlike the Rainbow Trout, and was an important source of food for the pioneers and Native Americans.	1997		
Flag	The Flag of Utah	This is the final design adopted as a new state flag of Utah. The design evokes images of snowy mountains and red rocks to represent the geography of Utah, the beehive represents "Industry" (the state's slogan) and Utah's nickname as "the Beehive State".	2024	Flag of Utah	
Flower	Sego lily Calochortus nuttallii	The bulbs of the sego lily were used as food for the Native Americans and for the Mormon pioneers when food became scarce.	1911		
Dance	Square dance	Andrew Love Neff, in his book History of Utah 1847-1869, says "The Mormons love dancing... almost every third man is a fiddler, and every one must learn to dance... Let it be remembered that only square dances were indulged in."	1994	A group of dancers in colorful Western clothing promenading in a circle, with a man speaking into a microphone on a stage in the background.	
Firearm	Browning M1911	Named due to inventor John Browning's ties to Utah.	2011		
Fossil	Allosaurus	A meat eater and the most common Theropod that lived during the late Jurassic period. Utah's Cleveland-Lloyd Dinosaur Quarry contains the densest concentration of Jurassic period fossils ever found and has more Allosaurus fossils have been found at the Quarry than anywhere else. The University of Utah's Utah Museum of Natural History has the world's largest collection of Allosaurus fossils.	1988		
Fruit	Cherry; Prunus avium	Cherries are a major fruit crop in the state of Utah. Cherry trees, given by Japan just after World War II, line the Utah State Capitol grounds.	1997		
Gem	Topaz	The semiprecious crystal is made from silicon, aluminium and fluorine. Utah topaz can be yellow, gold, red and pink in color. It is found in Juab, Tooele and Beaver counties.	1969		
Grass	Indian ricegrass Achnatherum hymenoides	Indian ricegrass is a perennial bunchgrass. The ricegrass is a vital food source for animals as it starts to produces green shoots in late winter and into spring, before other food sources start to grow. Native Americans would turn the seeds into flour for bread.	1990		
Hymn	Utah, We Love Thee	Utah's original state song from 1936 to 2003. The song was written in 1895 by Evan Stephens for celebrations held in 1896, when Utah became a state.	2003		
Insect	Honey bee Apis mellifera	Utah's nickname is the Beehive State. Utah was first called the State of Deseret with Deseret meaning honeybee in the Book of Mormon.	1983		
Language	English	Utah voters approved Initiative A on the 2000 ballot to make English become the official language.	2000	—	
Mineral	Copper	Utah is home to the Bingham Canyon Open Pit Copper Mine, which has produced copper since 1906. The mine has produced more copper than any other mine in history.	1994		
Motto	Industry	The beehive symbolizes industry. A beehive appears on the state flag, and the word Industry appears on the Great Seal of the State of Utah.	1959	—	
Mushroom	Porcini; Boletus edulis	They are very common around the mid and high elevations of Utah. It was added to show how important in the decomposition and health of the forests in the state.	2023		
Reptile	Gila monster Heloderma suspectum	Named the state reptile following a lobbying campaign by Utah middle schoolers. The Gila monster is the only venomous lizard native to the United States. Although the Gila monster is venomous, its sluggish nature means it represents little threat to humans.	2019		
Rock	Coal	Coal mines in Carbon and Emery counties have been operating since 1881.	1991		
Seal	The Great Seal of the State of Utah	The state seal contains a beehive in the middle, the word "industry" above the beehive and Sego Lilies growing on either side of the beehive. The bald eagle, two American flags, the date 1847, representing the year the pioneers arrived in Utah, and the date 1896, the year Utah became a state.	1896	Seal of Utah	
Song	Utah…This Is The Place	Written in 1996 for Utah's centennial celebration, it became the state song because school children "didn't like the current state song, Utah We Love Thee... that it wasn't very much fun to sing." Legislation presented by Dana Chambers Love on behalf of 4th graders from Davis County changed the song in 2003.	2003	—	
Star	Dubhe; Alpha Ursae Majoris	One of the stars composing the Big Dipper. Dubhe was chosen in 1996, the state's centennial, as it was supposedly 100 light years away. In actuality, the star is 124 light years away.	1996		
Stone	Honeycomb calcite	Named for its similar appearance to honeycomb, the stone has origins in Duchesne County. Floyd Anderson was the first to discover it in 1995 and it can only be found in the Uinta Mountains. Honeycomb calcite is used as an accent for buildings.	2021	Stone of Utah	
Tartan	Utah State Centennial Tartan	The Utah State Centennial Tartan represents the tartans worn by the Logan and Skene Scottish clans. Fur traders Ephraim Logan and Peter Skene Ogden explored Utah in the 1820s. The cities of Logan and Ogden as well as the Logan River and the Ogden River are named after them.	1996		
Tree	Quaking aspen Populus tremuloides	The 80,000-year-old Pando aspen grove in central Utah is also considered to be among the Earth's largest and oldest living organisms. The state tree was the Colorado blue spruce, prior to 2014.	2014		
Vegetable	Spanish sweet onion Allium cepa	The onion is a major crop in Box Elder and Weber counties.	2002		
Vegetable, Historic	Sugar beet Beta vulgaris	Sugar production in Utah was a huge enterprise from 1891 till 1920 and was dominated by the Utah-Idaho Sugar Company. A blight, caused by the beet curly top virus, severely dampened production until 1934. Production continued to drop from pressures of cheaper foreign sugar until there were no sugar factories left in Utah by 1980.	2002		
Work of land art	Spiral Jetty	Spiral Jetty is a work of art on the northeast shore of the Great Salt Lake by American sculptor Robert Smithson.	2017		

== Unofficial State symbols ==
Type	Symbol	Description	Adopted	Image	Source
Nickname	The Beehive State	The Beehive is a common symbol of Utah, with the state motto, seal, flag and emblem related to bees or the beehive.	Traditional	—	
Slogan	"Utah: Life Elevated"	Designed to market Utah for tourism and business, the slogan alludes to Utah's mountains, its snow and skiing. Past slogans have included, "greatest snow on earth" and "Utah: This is Still the Right Place".	2006	—	
Snack	Jell-O	Although not an official state symbol that appears in Utah Law, Jell-O, particularly green Jell-O, often appears as a symbol and cultural stereotype associated with the state and its Mormon population. In 2001 a simple resolution by the Utah State Senate was passed recognizing Jell-O as "a favorite snack food of Utah."	2001		

== See also ==
- Symbolism in The Church of Jesus Christ of Latter-day Saints
