= DezNat =

Mormon far-right movement

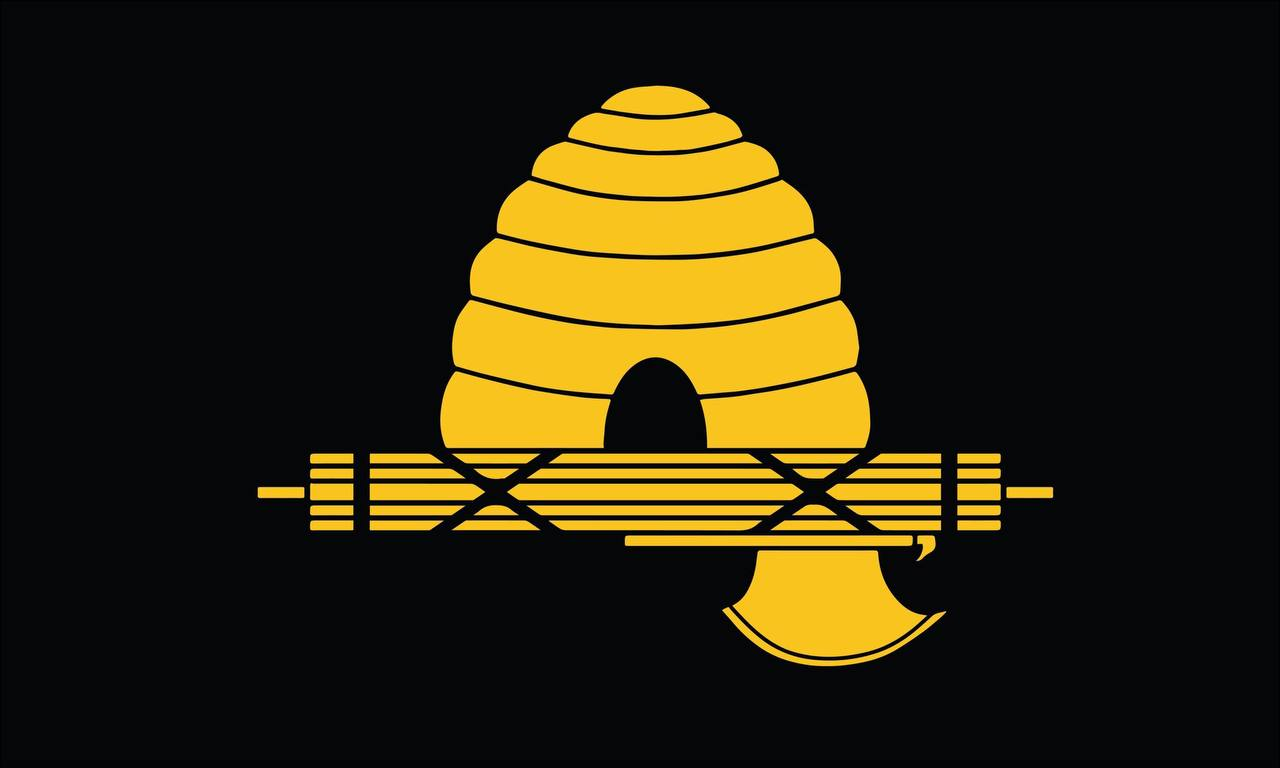
Left: A Utah beehive crossed with an Italian fasces.
Right: Original flag of the proposed State of Deseret

Deseret Nationalism, popularized online as #DezNat, is a Mormon nationalist movement in the United States known for its association with alt-right rhetoric. It originated in 2018 following the Unite the Right rally by Logan Smith, a member of the Church of Jesus Christ of Latter-day Saints, known as "JP Bellum" on Twitter. While the term originated as a Twitter hashtag, collecting upwards of 114,000 original posts, its significance goes beyond social media. DezNat represents a loosely affiliated group of LDS Church members who share common ideals and values, despite the church's negative stance on the concept.

The Daily Beast and The Daily Utah Chronicle have both described DezNat as an extremist, alt-right, white nationalist movement. The Guardian said the group was right-wing, with elements of far-right politics and eugenics. Social scientist Spencer Greenhalgh, speaking with The Salt Lake Tribune, described it as having "far-right influences". DezNat participants have typically said they only intend to organize orthodox Latter-day Saints and defend the church against critics. Users of the hashtag say they are not alt-right but are simply unapologetic about their beliefs. Spencer Greenhalgh and Amy Chapman say this framing is "disingenuous", describing the movement as existing in an online affinity space with red pill communities.

Some within the DezNat community have advocated for the restoration of the historical State of Deseret as an independent nation outside of U.S. jurisdiction. As well as the secession of a theocratic Mormon state, some DezNat commentators have suggested this should be a white ethnostate, using neo-Nazi and far-right accelerationist imagery. Logan Smith says the hashtag recognizes faithful LDS Church members as "a unique people and should be united spiritually, morally, economically, and politically behind Christ, the prophet, and the church", adding that DezNat "is the idea that devout members ought to work together to support the church, its doctrines, and each other on social media and in their communities to further build the Kingdom of God".

The community has been criticized for promoting bigotry and harassment against members of the LGBTQ community, non-Mormons and ex-Mormons, feminists, abortion-rights advocates, and pornographic film actors. Some have criticized the Mormon blog By Common Consent for being too politically progressive. Members also use bowie knife imagery as an homage to Brigham Young. Controversially, some within DezNat advocate for violent actions under the pretext of blood atonement for certain sins. According to the feminist writer Mary Ann Clements, DezNat proponents regard themselves as being in line with the actions of former church presidents, therefore not supporting polygamy today but referencing it regarding the past (e.g., by portraying Young as a polygamous "chad" or powerful "alpha male").

== Alaskan government investigation of Matthias Cicotte ==
In July 2021, investigative journalists at The Guardian identified Matthias Cicotte, an Alaska Assistant Attorney General, as a poster of racist and antisemitic Deseret Nationalist content using the Twitter account @JReubenCIark. (Note: J. Reuben Clark was a Mormon lawyer who worked in the Calvin Coolidge administration and is namesake of the law school at Brigham Young University.) Following the release of the report, civil rights organizations, including the NAACP, called for the termination of Cicotte from his position and the reopening of his cases. This prompted an investigation from the Alaska Department of Law and Cicotte was removed from his caseload. A Department spokesperson confirmed Cicotte was no longer working for them, stating: "However, although we cannot talk about personnel matters, we do not want the values and policies of the Department of Law to be overshadowed by the conduct of one individual." Shortly thereafter, the deans of J. Reuben Clark Law School, of which both Cicotte and Alaska Attorney General Treg Taylor are graduates, released a statement condemning the "venomous and hateful Twitter messages against a variety of vulnerable groups" from the @JReubenCIark account.
