= Symbolism in the Church of Jesus Christ of Latter-day Saints =

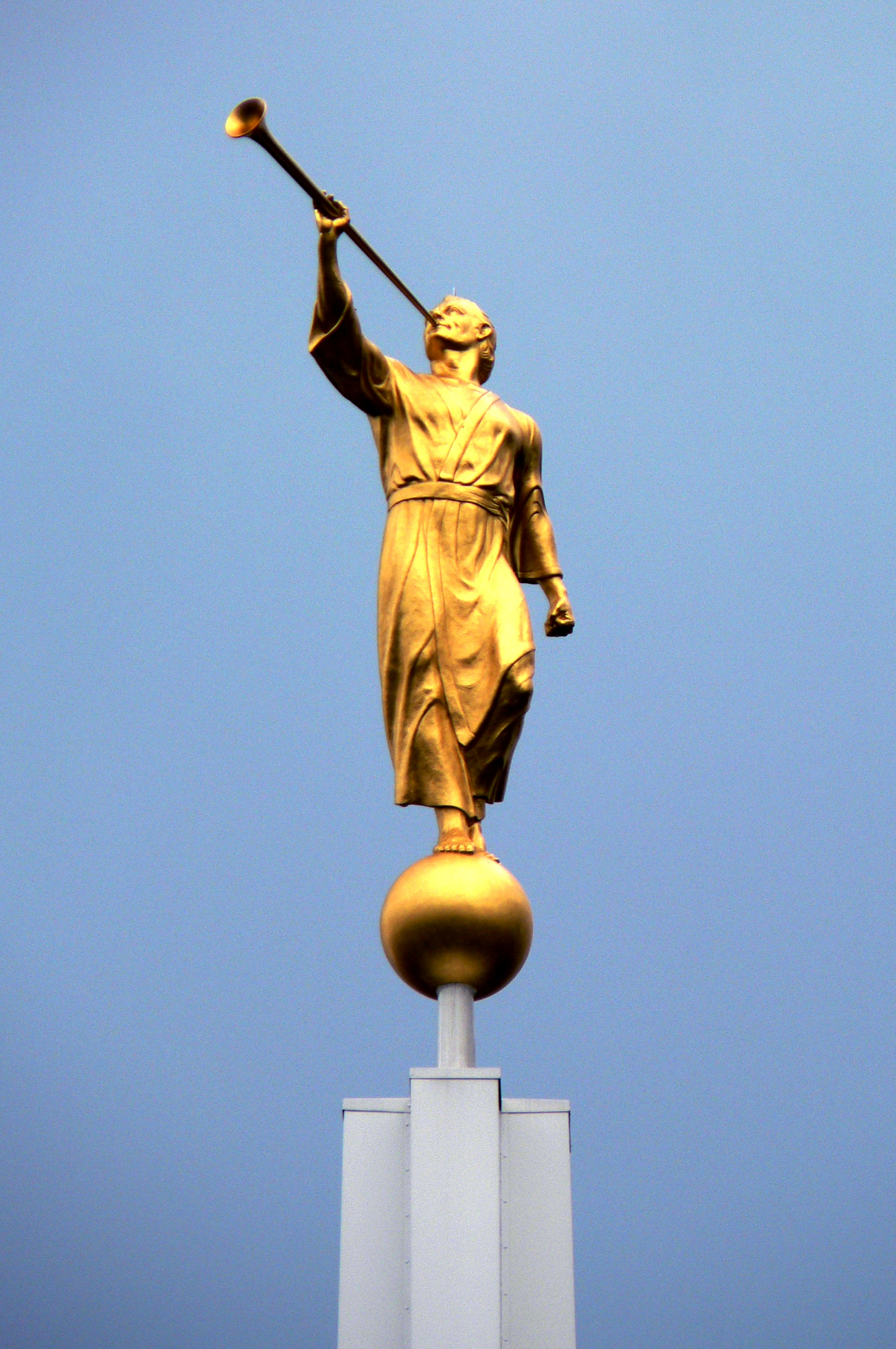
Bern Switzerland Temple statue of Angel Moroni

Symbolism in the Church of Jesus Christ of Latter-day Saints (LDS Church) is the process whereby objects or actions have been invested with an inner meaning expressing church ideas. The Church of Jesus Christ of Latter-day Saints and its membership have adopted a number of symbols that differ from those typically used in Christianity.

== Common symbols ==
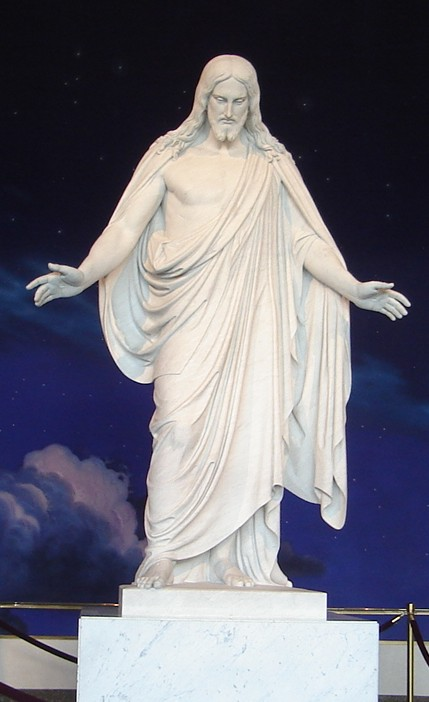
Replica of Thorvaldsen's Christus in Temple Square visitors' center

An image of the Angel Moroni blowing a trumpet is often used as an unofficial symbol of the Church of Jesus Christ of Latter-day Saints. Moroni is commonly identified by Latter-day Saints as the angel mentioned in Revelation 14:6, "having the everlasting gospel to preach unto them that dwell on the earth, and to every nation, and kindred, and tongue, and people". Moroni appears on the cover of some editions of the Book of Mormon, on USVA headstones, and statues of the angel stand atop many LDS temples. In 2007, the LDS Church claimed that an image of the angel Moroni in an advertisement violated one of the church's registered trademarks. However, in recent years, the church’s temples’ spires have not featured the angel Moroni, as had traditionally been the case.

Images of temples, especially of the Salt Lake Temple, are commonly used in Church of Jesus Christ of Latter-day Saints media as symbols of the faith. Additionally, church leaders have encouraged members to hang pictures of temples on the walls of their homes, and it has become a common cultural phenomenon described even in publications intended for children. The architecture of many church temples contain symbols and symbolic motifs.

A 3.4 m replica of Bertel Thorvaldsen's Christus is on display in the Temple Square North Visitors' Center in Salt Lake City. There are additional replicas of this statue in several other LDS Visitors' Centers, including those at the Mesa Arizona, Los Angeles California, the Washington D.C., and Laie Hawaii temples. The LDS Church commonly uses images of the statue in official church media, such as the Internet site churchofjesuschrist.org. On April 4, 2020, church president Russell M. Nelson announced the church would include the Christus, together with other elements, in a new "symbol" or "emblem" to represent the Church in its literature, news, and events.

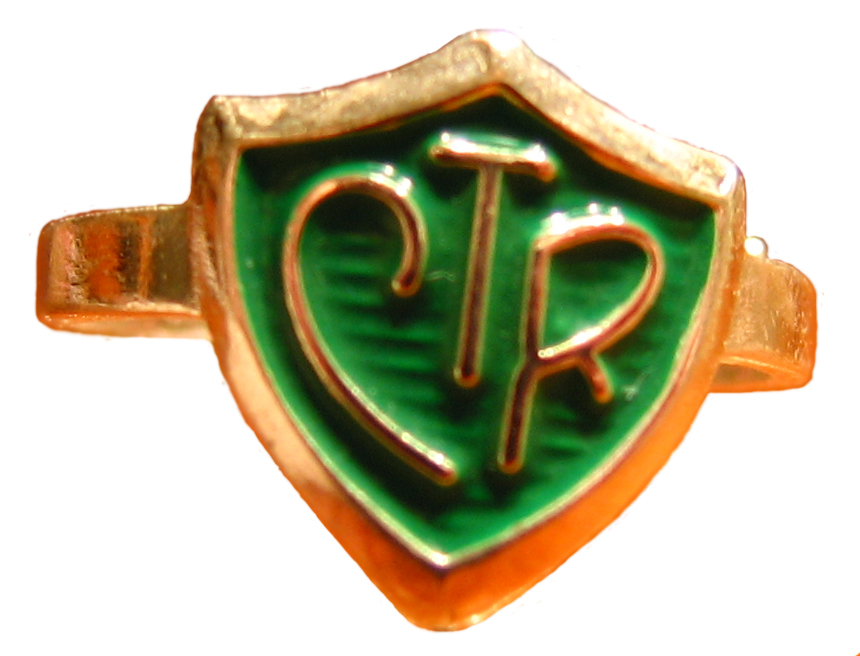
A CTR ring is a common symbol of the Church.

Members of the church may wear a ring with the Choose the Right shield to remind them to be righteous.

When questioned on the subject of symbols, church president Gordon B. Hinckley said that Latter-day Saints themselves are the best symbols of their religion.

== Sacred symbols ==
The church teaches that its ordinances are symbolic. Some of these ordinances are held in common with other Christian churches. For instance, in the sacrament of the Lord's Supper, bread represents the body of Jesus and water represents his blood. In baptism by immersion, the water represents purification and cleansing from sin, and immersion in water represents the death, burial, and resurrection of Jesus.

Ordinances performed in church temples differ from those practiced by other Christians. The church teaches that because "almost every aspect of [its] temple ceremony is symbolic ... each person should prepare to be as spiritually sensitive as possible to [its] symbolic nature". The symbolic elements involved in the temple ceremonies are considered sacred by members and are not generally discussed publicly by Latter-day Saints. Two symbolic aspects of temple practices are commonly referred to openly:

- Members who enter the temple change into white temple clothing to remind them of leaving outside the cares of the world, and of becoming one with each other by being dressed in similar clothing that symbolizes purity and cleanliness.
- Each temple includes a baptismal font patterned after the "molten sea" described in Solomon's Temple. The font is placed below ground level, signifying a place of symbolic burial of the carnal individual and a renewal of life as a "born again" individual who has covenanted to become clean through the atonement of Jesus. The font being placed below ground level also symbolizes that it is to be used for baptism for the dead—of people who have been buried. The font is placed on twelve oxen, three facing each direction, symbolizing the twelve tribes of Israel whose descendants are scattered throughout the earth. The church teaches that the dead person being baptized by proxy may accept the ordinance in the Spirit world and thus be joined with the House of Israel in an eternal covenant with Jesus.

Latter-day Saints who have participated in the endowment ceremony wear temple garments as underclothes. Wearing the garment is viewed as "an outward expression of an inward commitment" to follow Jesus. The garments contain four embroidered marks over the breasts, the navel, and the right knee, each of which has symbolic meaning to serve as reminders to the wearer of covenants made as part of the endowment.

== Guidelines ==
By policy, no pictures or icons are depicted in the chapel within LDS Church meetinghouses, in order to avoid an image becoming the focus of worship. However, images such as paintings of Christ and photographs of LDS Church leaders and temples are common in other parts of church buildings.

Unlike many other Christians, the Church of Jesus Christ of Latter-day Saints does not use the cross, crucifix or ichthys as symbols of faith. Many Latter-day Saints view crucifixion-related symbols as emphasizing the death of Jesus rather than his life and resurrection. The early LDS Church was more accepting of the symbol of the cross, but after the turn of the 20th century, an aversion to it developed in Mormon culture. In 1957, church president David O. McKay institutionalized the cultural uneasiness regarding the cross, stating that wearing cross jewelry is not appropriate for Latter-day Saints, and that the use of the cross is a "Catholic form of worship".

The Church of Jesus Christ of Latter-day Saints strongly discourages tattoos, including those which incorporate LDS symbols promoted in other art forms. Likewise body piercing, even if they include symbols that would otherwise be acceptable, are discouraged.

In the 1950s there was a resistance from LDS Church leadership to having artistic portrayals of Jesus. For example, when Arnold Friberg created his series of Book of Mormon paintings, his initial portrayal of Christ visiting the Americas was rejected by LDS Church leadership. Friberg's final portrayal shows Christ at a distance, descending far from the sky.

== See also ==
- Christian symbolism
- Culture of the Church of Jesus Christ of Latter-day Saints § Symbols
- List of Utah state symbols
- Mormon art
- Mormon folklore: Material objects
- Religious symbolism
