= Flag of Utah =

U.S. state flag

State of Utah
- The Beehive Flag
- Use: Civil and state flag
- Proportion: 3:5
- Adopted: March 9, 2024; 2 years ago
- Design: Rectangle divided into three sections by two lines, with blue on top, white in the middle housing a blue hexagon outlined in gold with a gold beehive inside, a white five-pointed star below, and red at the bottom.
- Historic State Flag
- Use: Historic civil and state flag
- Proportion: 5:8
- Adopted: July 25, 1913; 113 years ago (Final iteration: February 16, 2011; 15 years ago)
- Design: A state coat of arms encircled in a golden circle with the number "1896" written in white text, on a field of dark navy blue.
- Historic State Flag Enhanced Variant
- Use: Historic civil and state flag
- Proportion: 5:8
- Adopted: February 16, 2011; 15 years ago
- Design: An enhanced variant of the state coat of arms encircled in a golden circle with the number "1896" written in white text, on a field of dark navy blue.

The flag of the U.S. state of Utah was adopted on March 9, 2024, and is one of the official flags of the state. It is a horizontal tricolor of irregular blue, white, and red bands, with the white band featuring a gold-outlined blue hexagon containing a gold beehive above a five-pointed white star.

The former design (1913–2024) was re-designated as the "Historic State Flag" and retains co-official status in the state. It continues to fly year-round at the Utah Capitol, as well as on special occasions statewide. It can be flown at any time by private citizens.

== Statute ==
The 2024 Utah Code, Title 63G, Chapter 1, Part 5, Section 501 states that the state flag of Utah shall be:

...a rectangular flag with a width-to-length ratio of three to five, divided by two irregular horizontal lines into three segments: a blue top segment above the higher line, a white middle segment between the lines whose upper edge forms a five-peaked mountain with the center peak tallest and aligned with the highest point of a central hexagon and whose lower edge follows the lowest point of that hexagon, and a red bottom segment below the lower line; centered within the middle segment shall be a blue hexagon containing a smaller gold hexagon outline, within which is a gold beehive composed of five sections with a small semicircle removed from the center of the base of the lowest section, and below the center of the beehive shall be placed a white five-pointed star.

== Design and symbolism ==
The red, white, and blue tricolor references the colors of the flag of the United States. At the top, a blue stripe symbolizes Utah's skies and lakes and fundamental principles such as faith, knowledge, and freedom. It also imitates the blue background of the state's historic flag. The white middle stripe evokes peace and is divided into five peaks, representing the snowy peaks of Utah's mountains. Below, a red canyon stripe signifies Southern Utah's desert landscapes and the spirit of perseverance. In the center of the flag, a beehive design represents Utah's industrial character and official nickname, the Beehive State. The gold hexagon resembles honeycomb, representing the strength of Utah's people. The beehive within the hexagon symbolizes industry, prosperity, and unity. Below the beehive is a five-pointed star, which honors the five original tribal nations in Utah, and also alludes to Utah's 45th star on the American flag, representing the state's allegiance to the nation.

=== Colors ===
The colors designated for the flag are as follows:

Color scheme	Navy Blue	White	Dark Red	Amber
CMYK	90-60-0-71	0-0-0-0	0-99-100-33	0-28-89-0
HEX	#071D49	#FFFFFF	#AA0200	#FFB81D
RGB	7-29-73	255-255-255	170-2-0	255-184-29

== History ==
=== Pre-statehood ===
==== Pioneer era flags ====
Flag of Deseret

Alternative flag of Deseret based on an 1877 description by Don Maguire

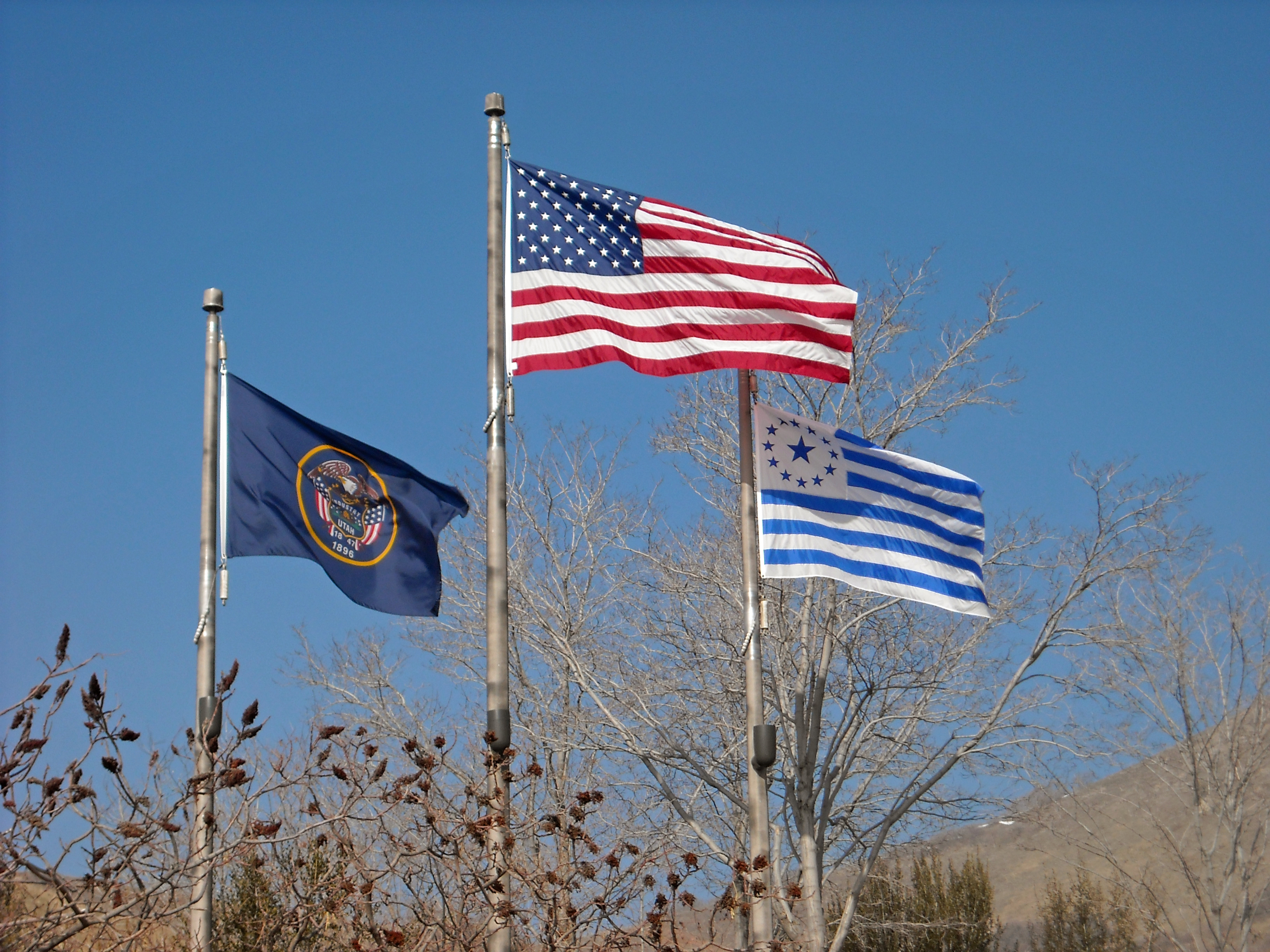
United States flag (center) pre-2011 Utah state flag (left) and the Mormon pioneers flag (right)
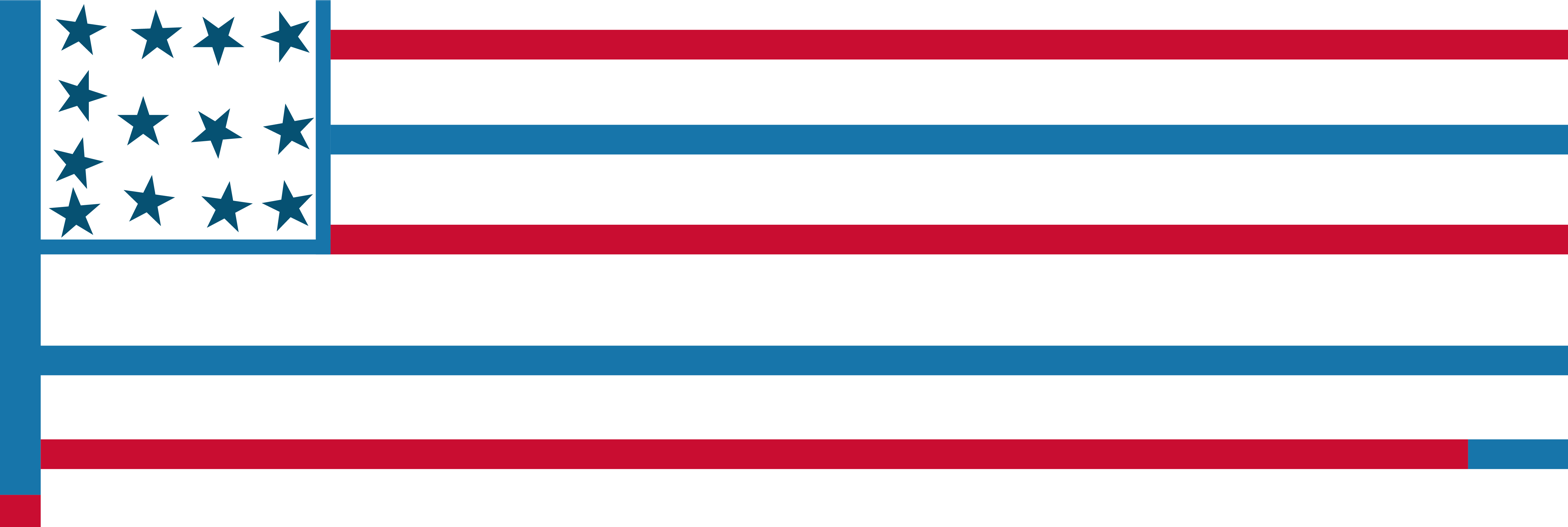
Digital reconstruction of a unique pioneer flag

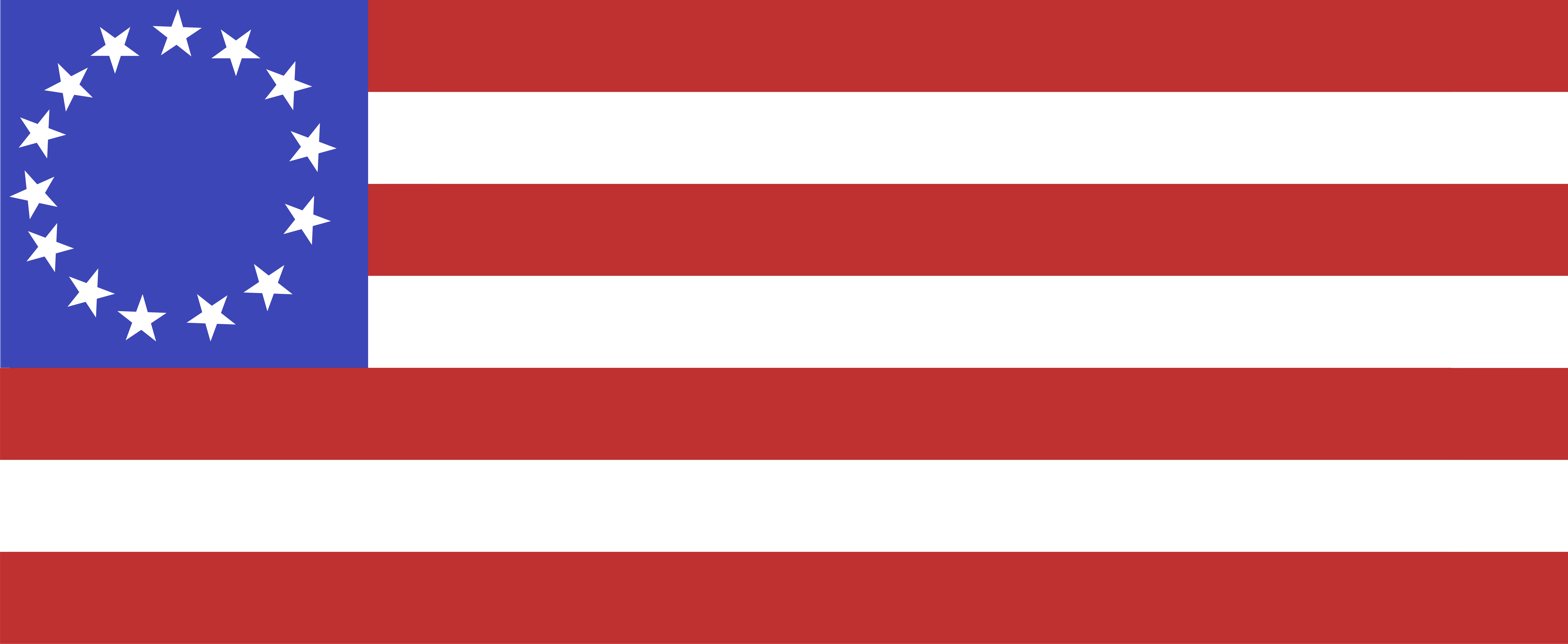
Digital reconstruction of a 15 star American flag raised in 1847

Digital reconstruction of the flag raised in Salt Lake City, 1849

Digital reconstruction of the flag carried by a group of elderly pioneers, 1849

As allegedly designed by council in 1848, this flag was the first flag designed to unify the Saints as they celebrated their first pioneer day. This flag was lost in the 1850s but later recreated by the Church of Jesus Christ of Latter-day Saints in 2002 and has flown on Ensign Peak since. Contemporary reports describe similar flags being flown in 1877 at the funeral of Brigham Young and in 1880 at the Golden Jubilee of the Church of Jesus Christ of Latter Day Saints. There is currently no historic documentation available to support this flag. The pioneers also carried a banner that was described as bearing a portrait of Joseph Smith and angel holding a scroll with the names of all the pioneers.

==== Flag of the State of Deseret ====
One of the earlier flags of Deseret, reconstructed

A cavalry guidon of the Utah-era version of the Nauvoo Legion

Reconstruction of one of the flags that flew in Pikes Peak Colorado during the Pioneer Day Celebration, on July 24, 1856

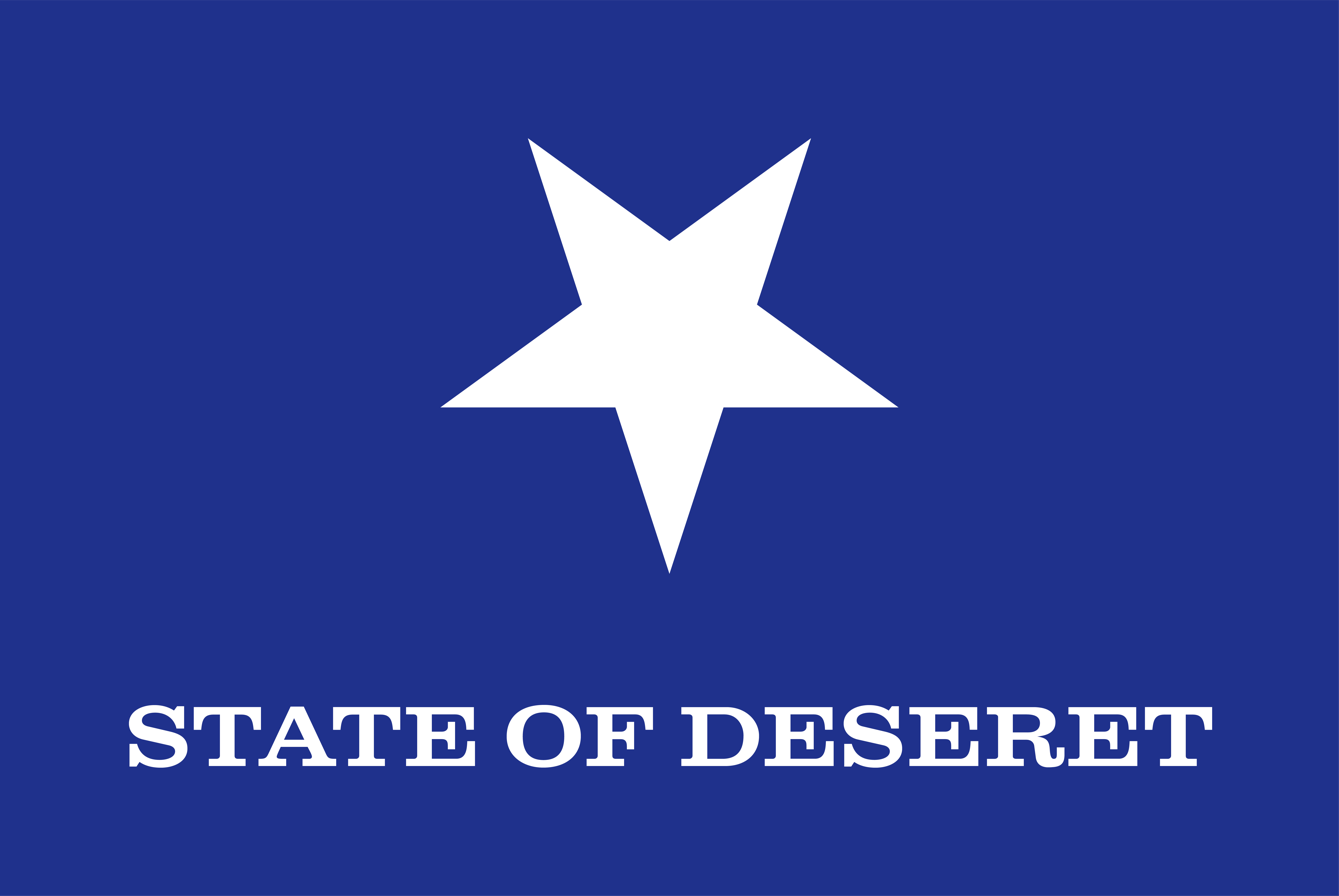
Recreation of a flag that flew on top of Livingston, Kinkead & Co building in Salt Lake City, on July 4th, 1855

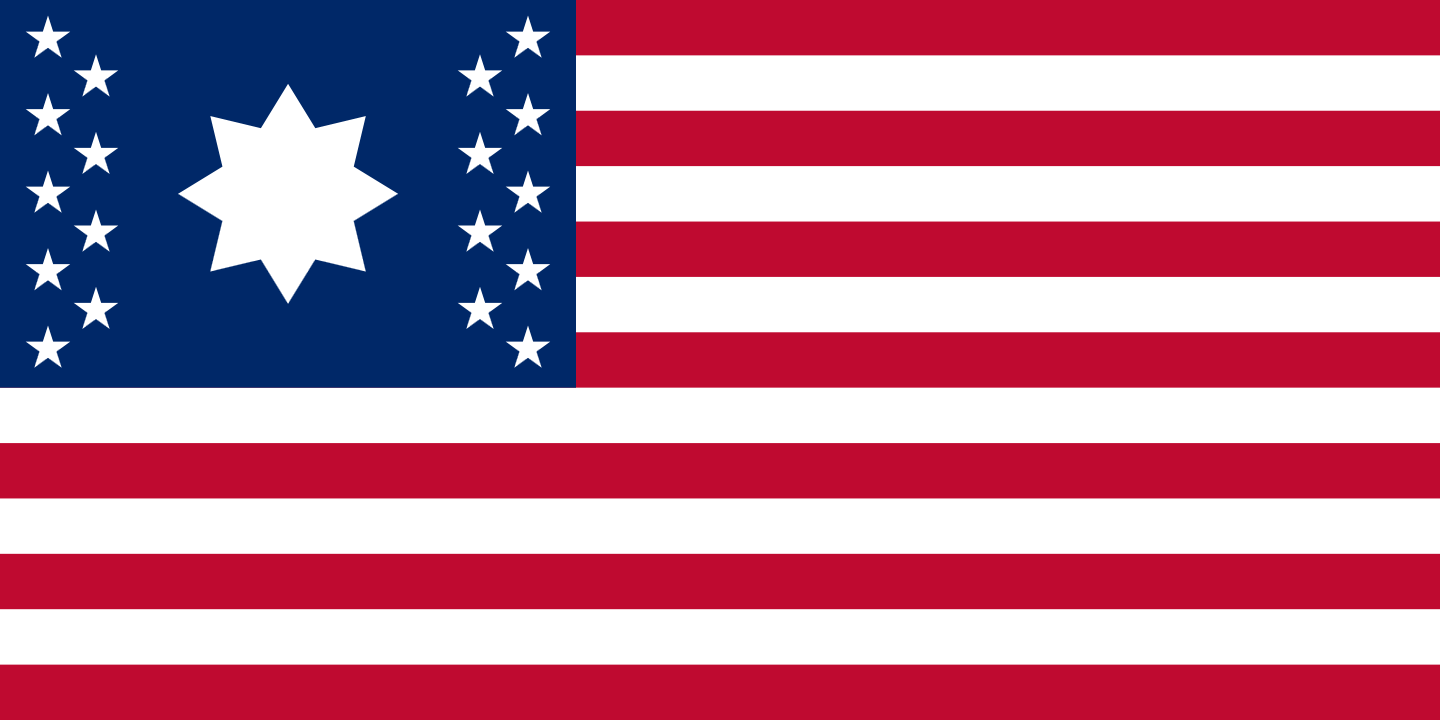
Reconstruction of the flag raised in Las Vegas, Nevada on July 4, 1855

According to most descriptions, the flag of the State of Deseret was similar to the flag of the State of Utah, but as it was not standardized, multiple other secular and religious alternatives were also used.

==== Utah Territory ====
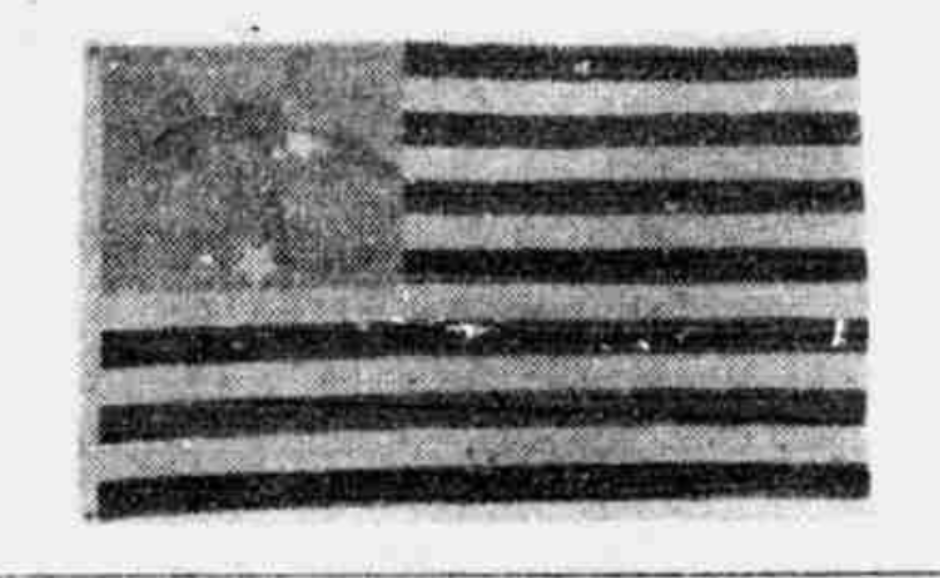
1851 Territory Flag

The flag carried by the pioneers of Parowan, 1851

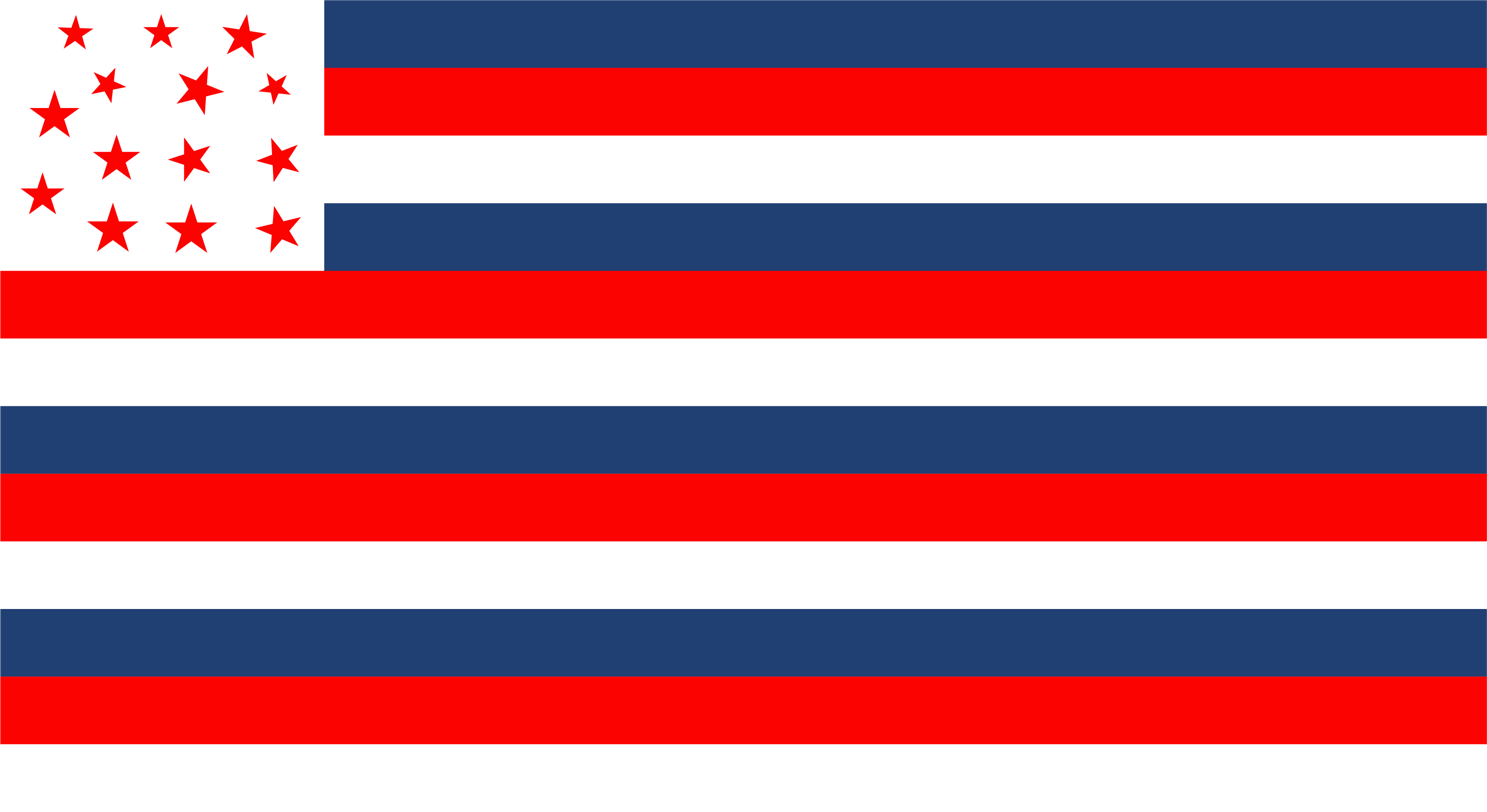
Flag flown by the pioneers of Nephi, c. 1850–1851

Reconstruction of a flag raised in 1855

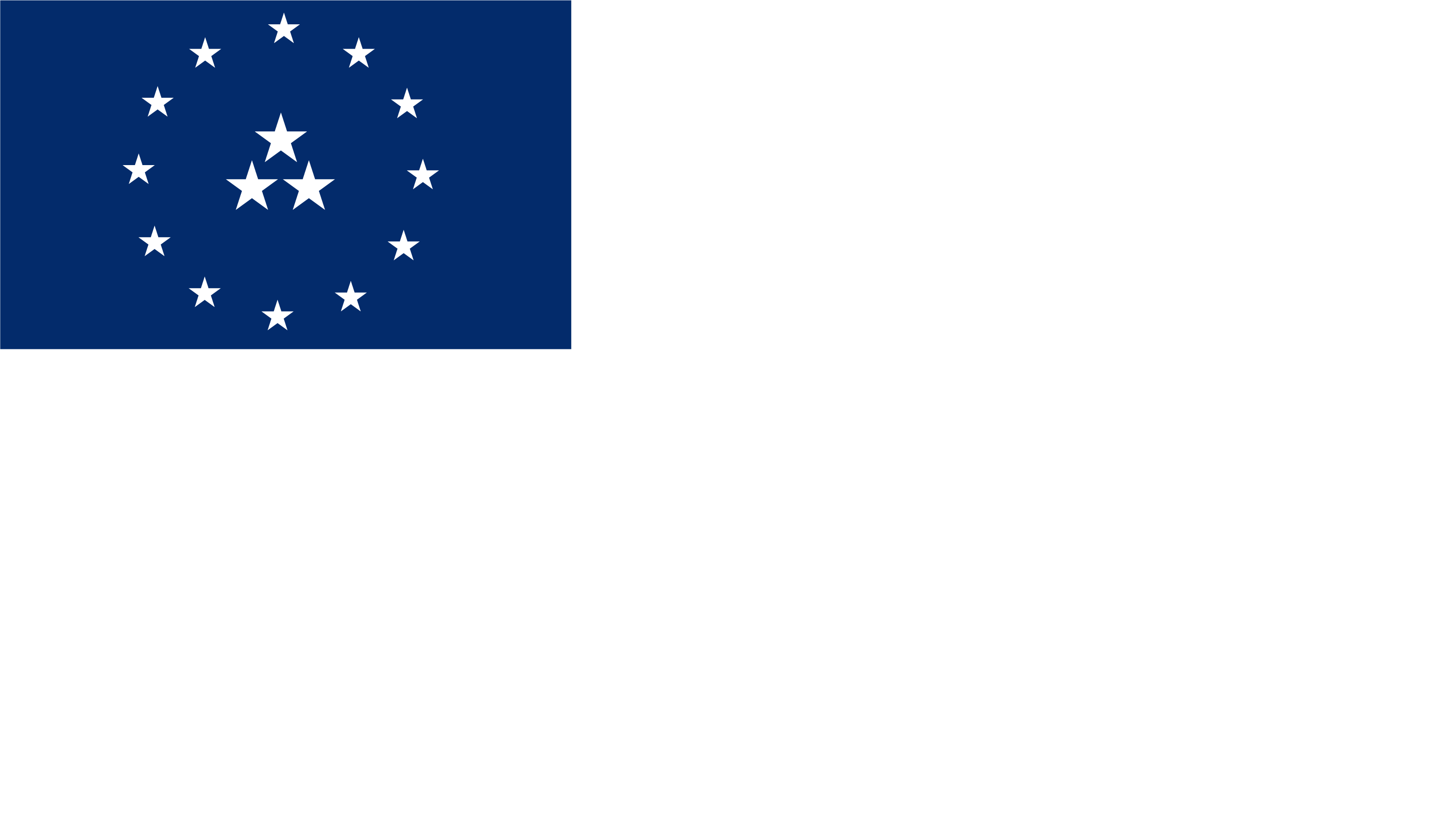
Reconstruction of the flag raised in Salt Lake City, 1880

The territorial flag was the Stars and Stripes with a unique canton, it contained 13 stars with a bald eagle. The bird had its wings spread out and was perched on top of a beehive. Underneath it was a large 5 pointed star representing the territory. There was a variant of the territorial flag with blue fabric and the old coat of arms of Utah Territory. There is currently no evidence that the Utah Territory flag was made into an actual flag to fly during the Territory's existence (1850–1896), though copies have since been made. In the early years of the Territory, many of the pioneers flew unique homemade American flags. During the Utah War, Latter-day Saints flew a flag described as a "...flag of their own, representing a beehive and embellished with portraits of Brigham Young, (Joseph) Smith and other (Latter-day Saint) dignitaries..."

=== State of Utah ===
==== Statehood flags ====
Utah's Statehood flag

Reconstruction of the statehood flag raised in Kamas, Utah

Reconstruction of the flag flown in Monticello

When Utah became the 45th state in 1896, American flags across the country flew 45 stars. In Salt Lake City they produced a massive American flag, one of the largest in the world at the time at around 74 feet high and 132 feet long. It hung from the ceiling of the Salt Lake Tabernacle, and one year later was moved to the south wall of the Salt Lake Temple where it was flown until 1903. Another unique flag flown to celebrate statehood was in Kamas. Bishop Antwood's sleigh was dragged across the town's streets carrying with it a blue banner with one star. The star stood for Utah. In Monticello, a lady on horseback rode through the middle of town carrying a blue banner with a white beehive. The first state flag was flown in 1894, although its design is not known. The Another state flag was flown 3 years later, It bore the coat of arms of the state. In May of 1899, members of the Signal Corps went to the top of Ensign Peak and raised a state flag. Once again, there is no mention of the details of the flag.

==== 1903 design ====
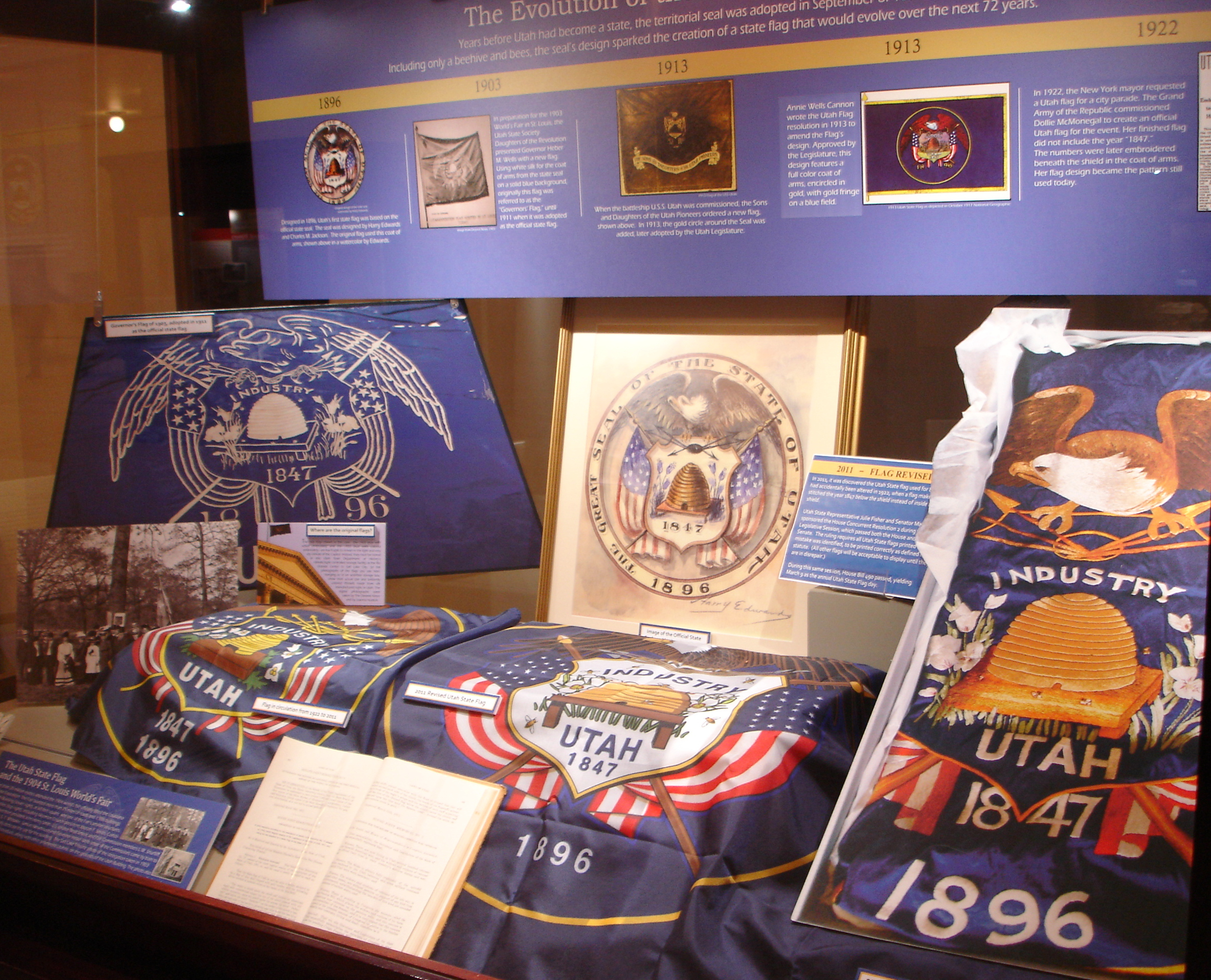
A display at the Utah State Capitol describing the history of the flag

Flag of Utah (unofficial) (1903–circa 1909)

Flag of Utah (unofficial) (circa 1909–1911)

Flag of Utah (1911–1913)

The flag's basic design uses the Seal of Utah which was adopted by the state legislature on April 3, 1896. The seal was designed by Charles M. Jackson, a crime reporter for the Salt Lake Herald, and Harry Emmett Edwards, an artist and bartender, and has similarities with the seal of the Utah Territory. The state's first flag was created in March 1903 to be used at the Louisiana Purchase Exposition in St. Louis, Missouri. Heber M. Wells, the governor of Utah, asked the Utah State Society Daughters of the Revolution (not to be confused with Daughters of the American Revolution) to oversee the creation of a flag. On May 1, 1903, the governor and his delegation marched, under the new flag, in the parade of states. The flag was blue, with the state seal and the year "1896" hand-embroidered in white thread in the flag's center. Initially, this flag was known as the "Governor's Flag" until Senate Joint Resolution 17 was passed by the legislature on March 9, 1911, making it the official state flag.

==== 1913 design ====
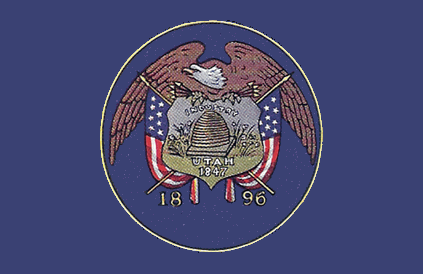
Flag of Utah (1913–1922)

Flag of Utah (1922–2011)

Flag of Utah (2011–2024)

Flag of Utah, enhanced variant (2011–2024)

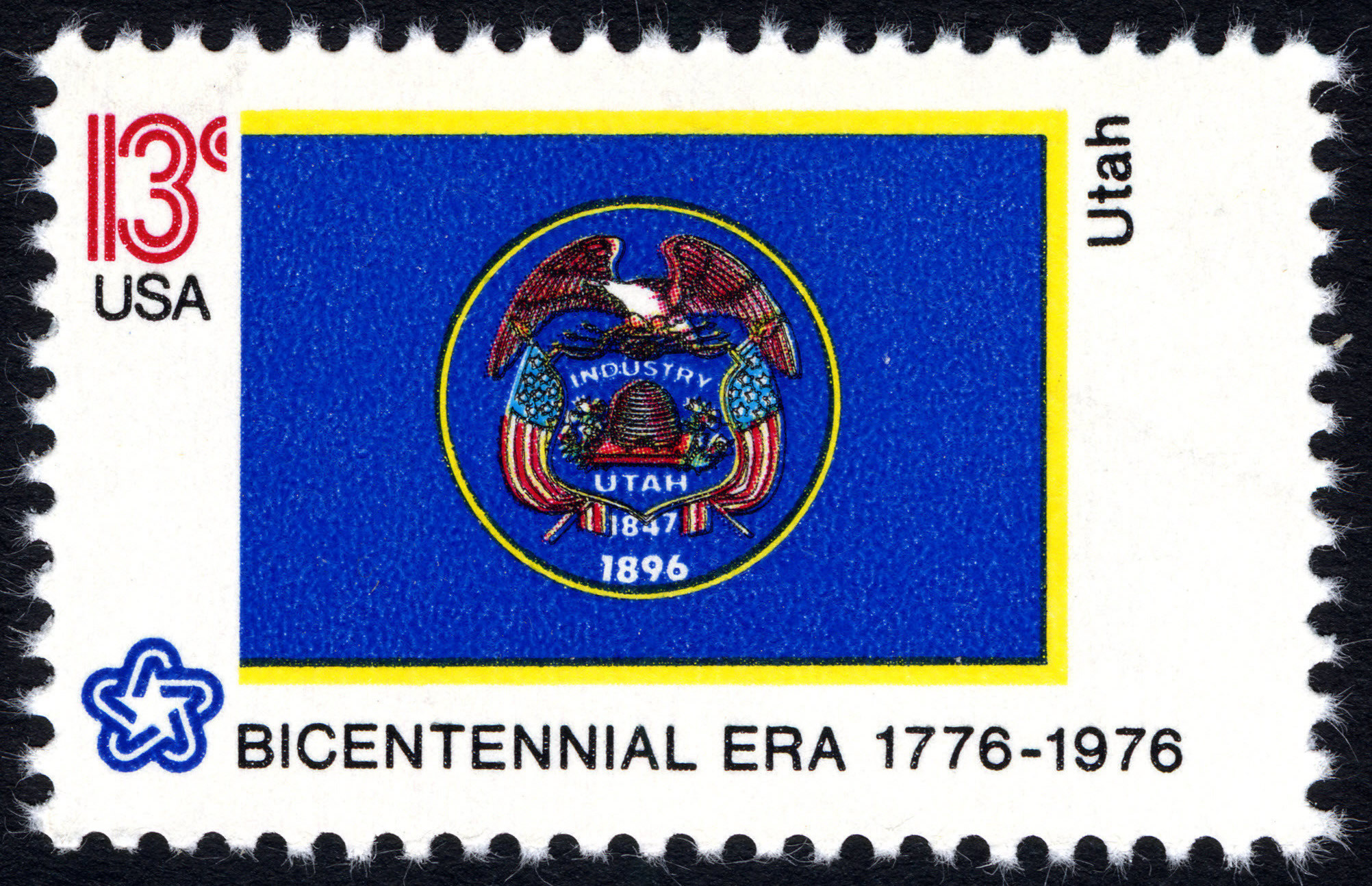
The Utah state flag as depicted in the 1976 bicentennial postage stamp series.

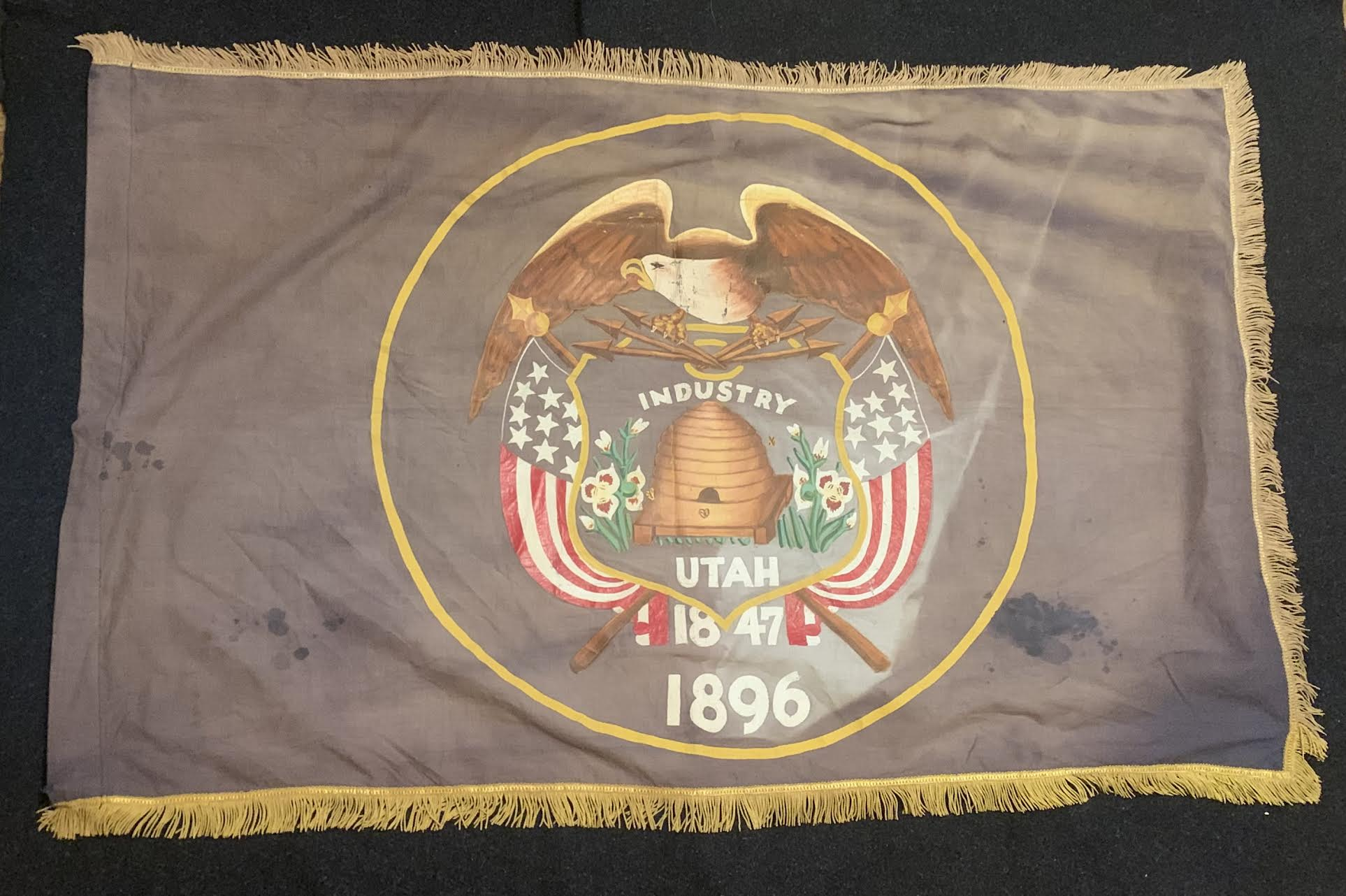
Early state flag with a hand painted seal (obverse)

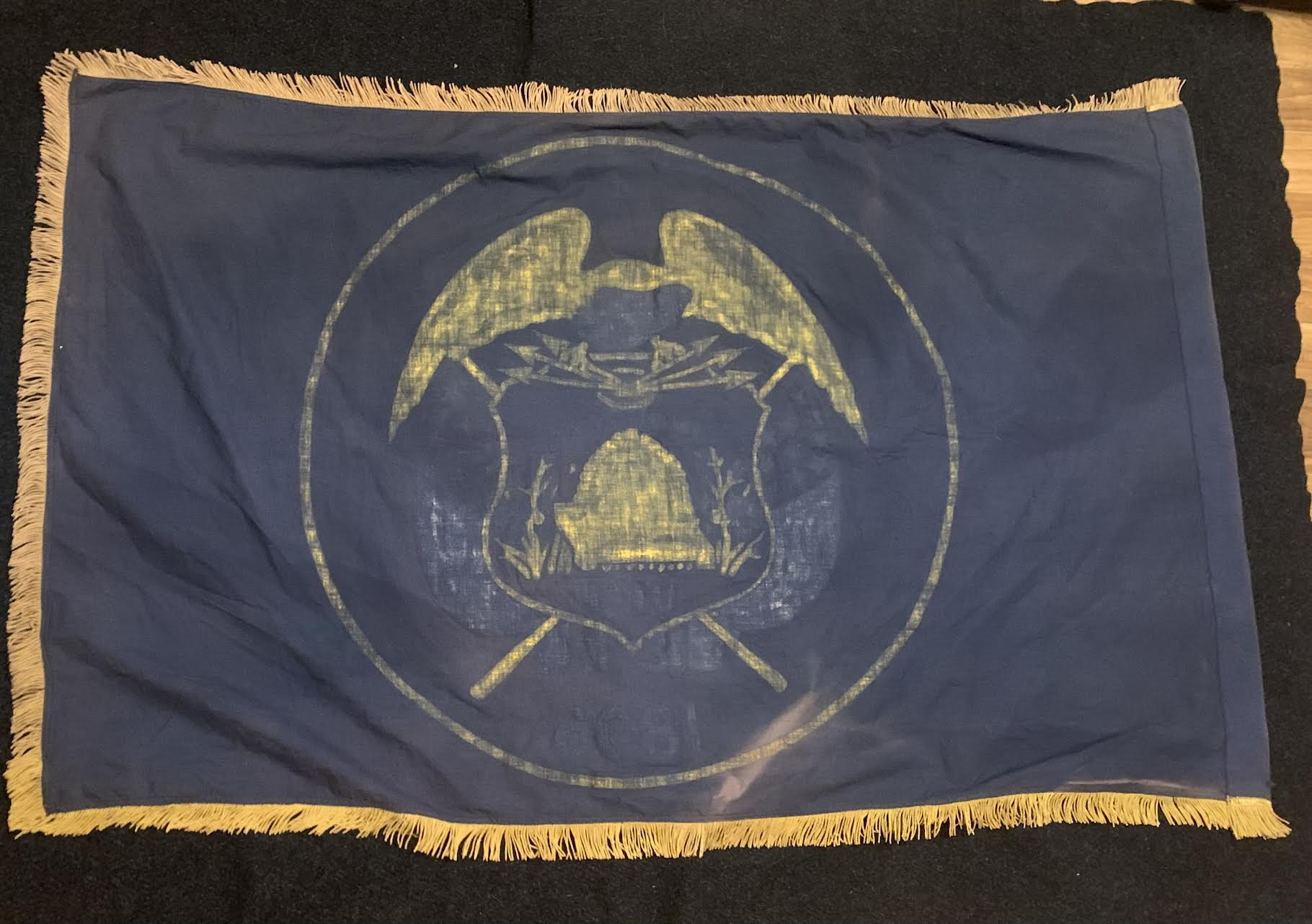
(reverse)

In 1912, the Sons and Daughters of Utah Pioneers ordered a custom made copy of the newly adopted flag to be presented to the recently commissioned battleship USS Utah. When the flag arrived, the group discovered that the shield on the flag was in full color instead of white, and the manufacturer had added a gold ring around the shield. Rather than have the flag remade, Annie Wells Cannon introduced HJR 1 and the Utah legislature changed the law to allow the manufacturer's changes to become part of the official flag. Prior to being received by the ship on June 25, 1913, the new flag was displayed at the state capitol in January 1913, then in the ZCMI windows on Main Street and at a ball held in honor of the flag.

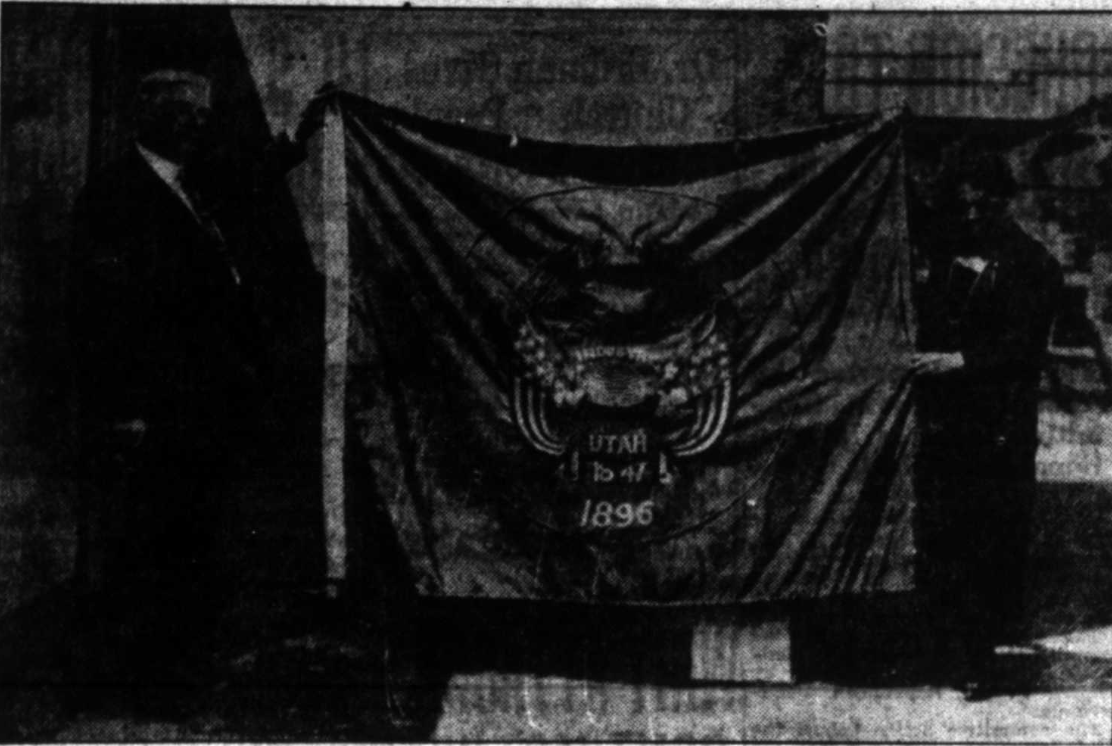
State flag from 1924

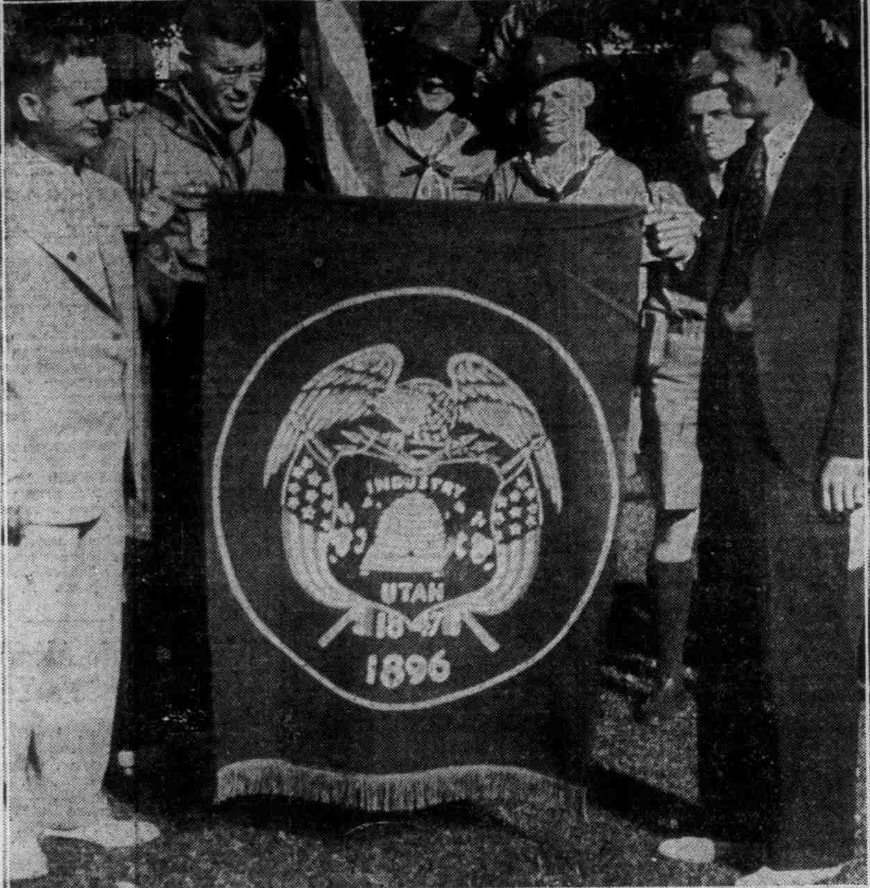
Variant of the state flag from 1935

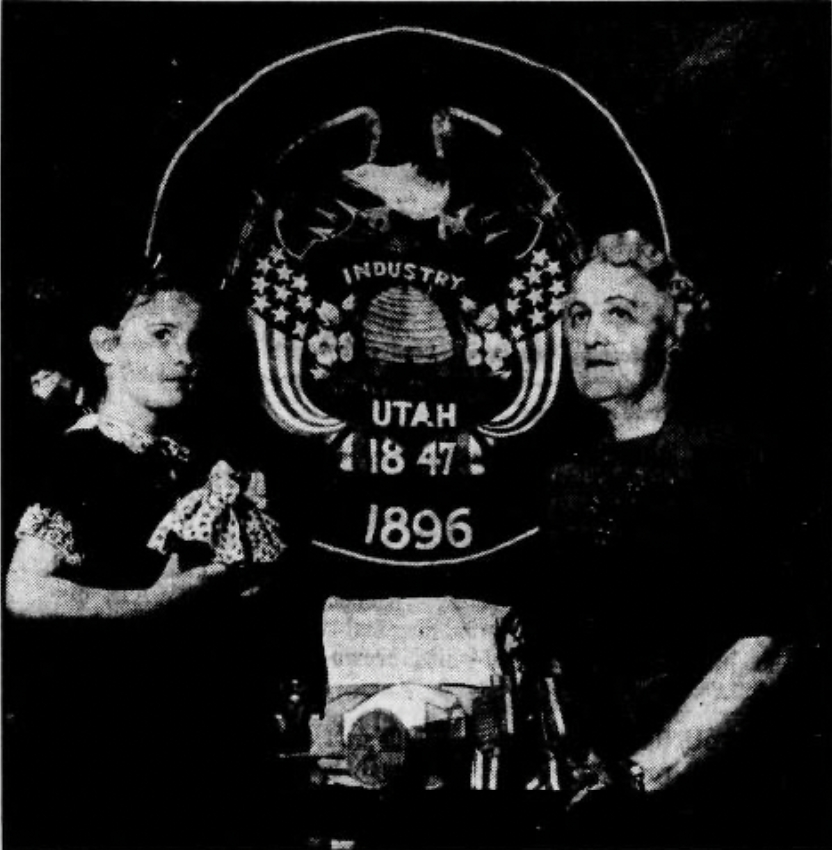
State flag from 1940

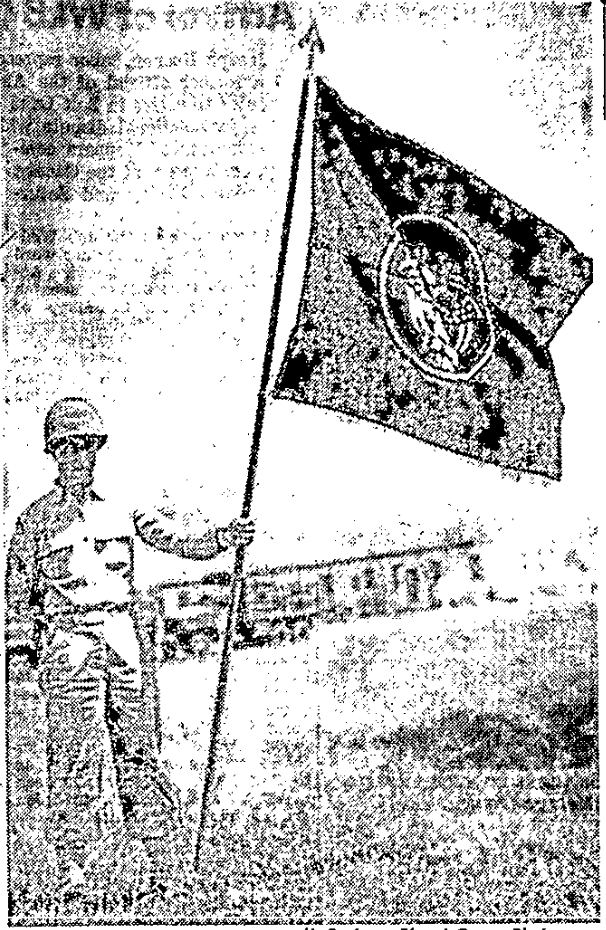
State flag from 1943

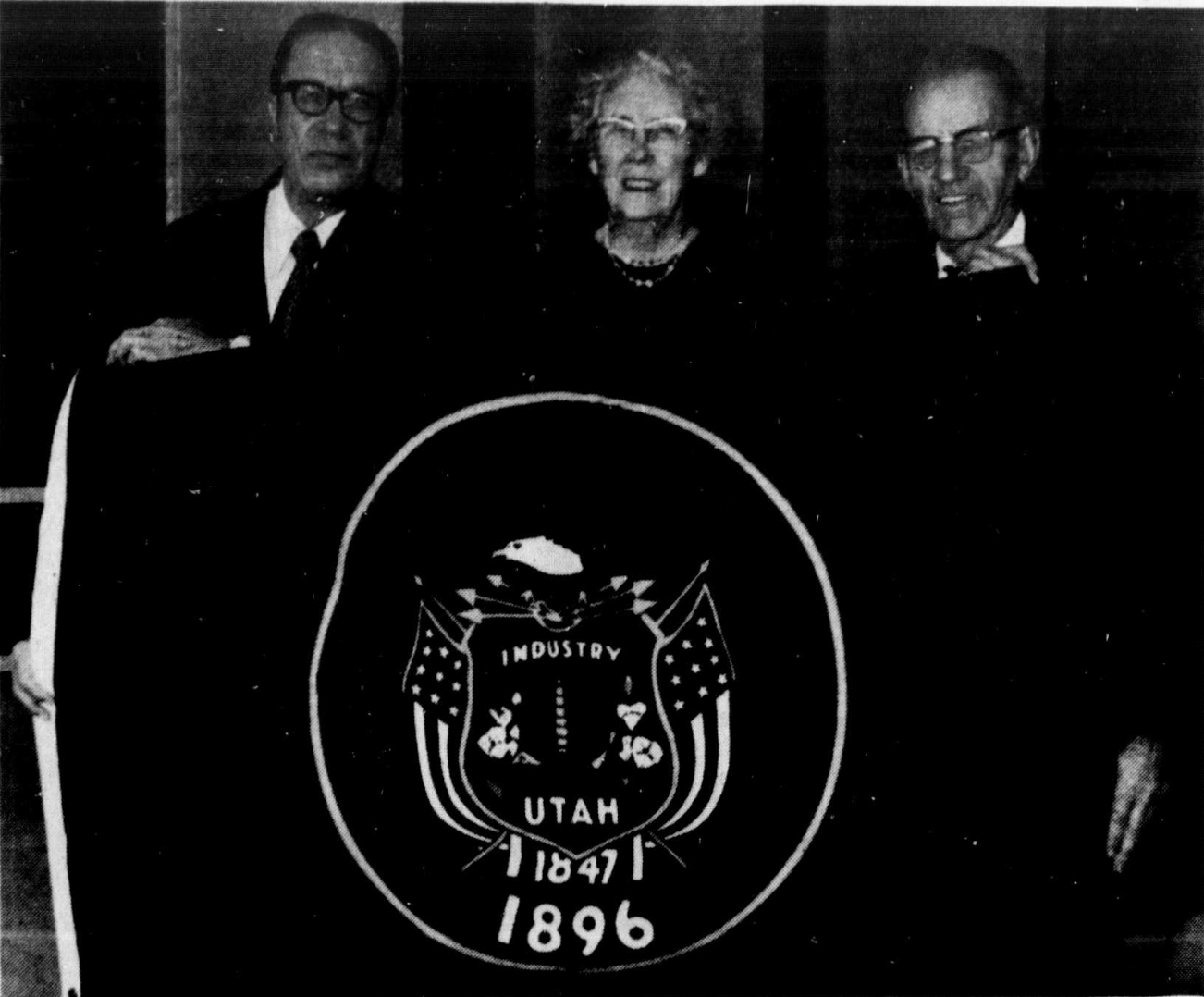
State flag from 1973

During the 59th state legislative session in 2011, a Concurrent Resolution (HCR002) was adopted requiring flag makers to fix a mistake found on all then-current Utah state flags. The mistake originated in 1922 when a flag maker misplaced the year 1847, by stitching it just above the year 1896, instead of in its correct position on the shield. It is believed every flag made since 1922 used this flag as a model, and the mistake persisted for 89 years. Later that same 2011 session, House Bill #490 passed the legislature, making March 9 an annual Utah State Flag day.

===== 1927 redesign attempt =====
Proposed flag of Utah (1927)

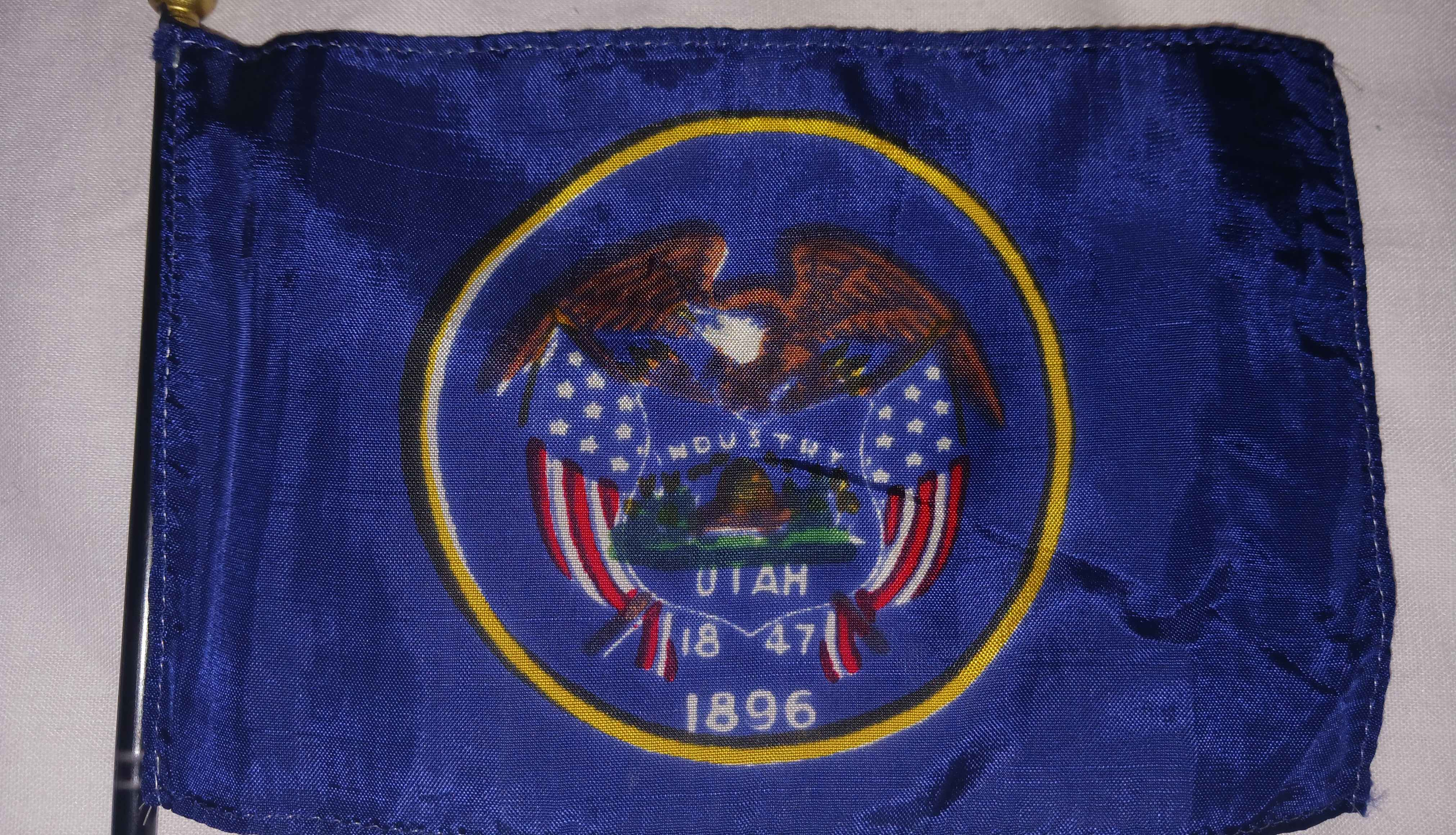
A vintage small flag with the pre-2011 design.

In 1927, Governor George Dern, during his address to the Utah State Legislature, requested the state adopt a much simpler flag that could be made quickly and cheaply and could fly alongside the American flag. Nothing was done, however, until in 1930 when flag enthusiast Lilliebell Falck, from Ogden, approached him with a few simplified designs. Her favorite was a white beehive with 28 lines to represent Utah's counties. The design was eventually scrapped later that year due to growing opposition by the Sons and Daughters of Utah Pioneers.

===== Salt Lake Tribune design contest (2002) =====
2002 Salt Lake Tribune contest finalists
Design 1

Design 2

Design 3

Design 4

Design 5

Design 6

Design 7 (version 1)

Design 7 (version 2)

Design 8

Design 9

Design 10

Design 11

Design 12

Design 13

Design 14

Design 15

Design 16

Design 17

Design 18

Design 19 (version 1)

Design 19 (version 2)

Design 20

Design 21

Design 22

Design 23

Design 24 (version 1)

Design 24 (version 2)

Design 25

Design 26

Design 27

Design 28

Design 29

Design 30

Design 31

Design 32 (version 1)

Design 32 (version 2)

Design 33

Design 34

Design 35

In 2002, The Salt Lake Tribune, along with the North American Vexillological Association, solicited designs for a new state flag. Over 1,000 designs were submitted, with the top 35 selected for judging. However, no flags from this contest were adopted by the state.

==== 2024 design ====
The current flag of Utah (2024–present)

The official "Historic State Flag" of Utah (2024–present)

The official "Historic State Flag enhance variant" of Utah (2024–present)

Proposed flag of Utah (2019)

In 2018, State Representatives Steve Handy and Keven Stratton proposed two different approaches to updating the Utah flag. Representative Handy proposed creating a flag commission to receive input and designs from the public, with the ultimate goal of proposing a new flag to the legislature. Representative Stratton sponsored separate legislation to adopt a specific flag design. The Utah House of Representatives was more amenable to a proposal to involve the public with a commission, but both efforts ultimately failed in 2019.

Representative Handy proposed another bill in 2020, this time keeping the 2011 design as a "historical flag". However, the effort stalled in the House Political Subdivisions Committee on a tie vote.

After a failed 2020 redesign effort, State Senator Daniel McCay started a bill in the Utah Senate. To prepare for the debate, the House and Senate watched a TED Talk by Roman Mars, "Why city flags may be the worst designed thing you've never noticed." In addition to the Ted Talk, the lead designer for the Utah Jazz, Ben Barnes, shared a set of prototype designs for lawmakers.

2020 prototype designs
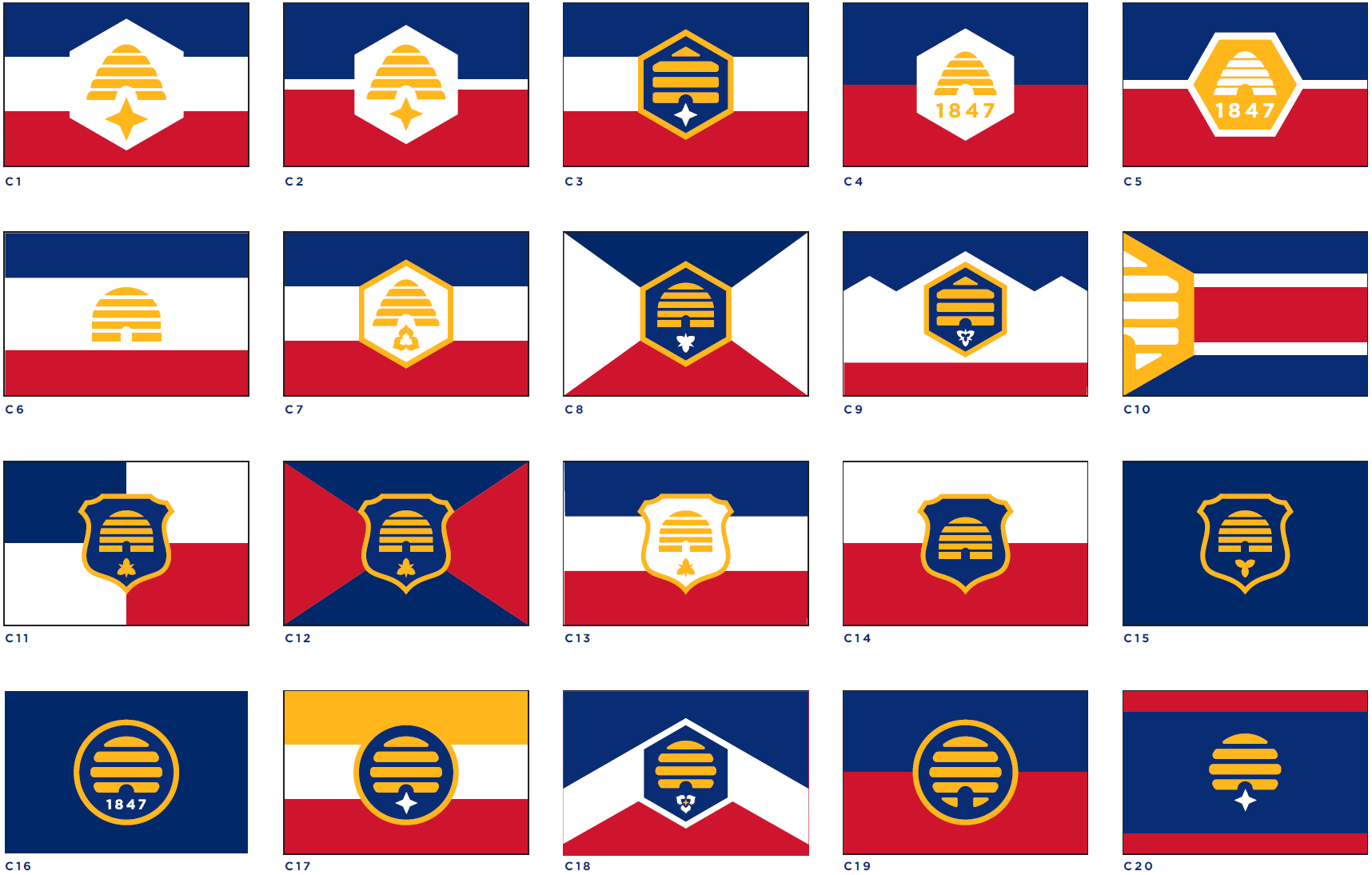

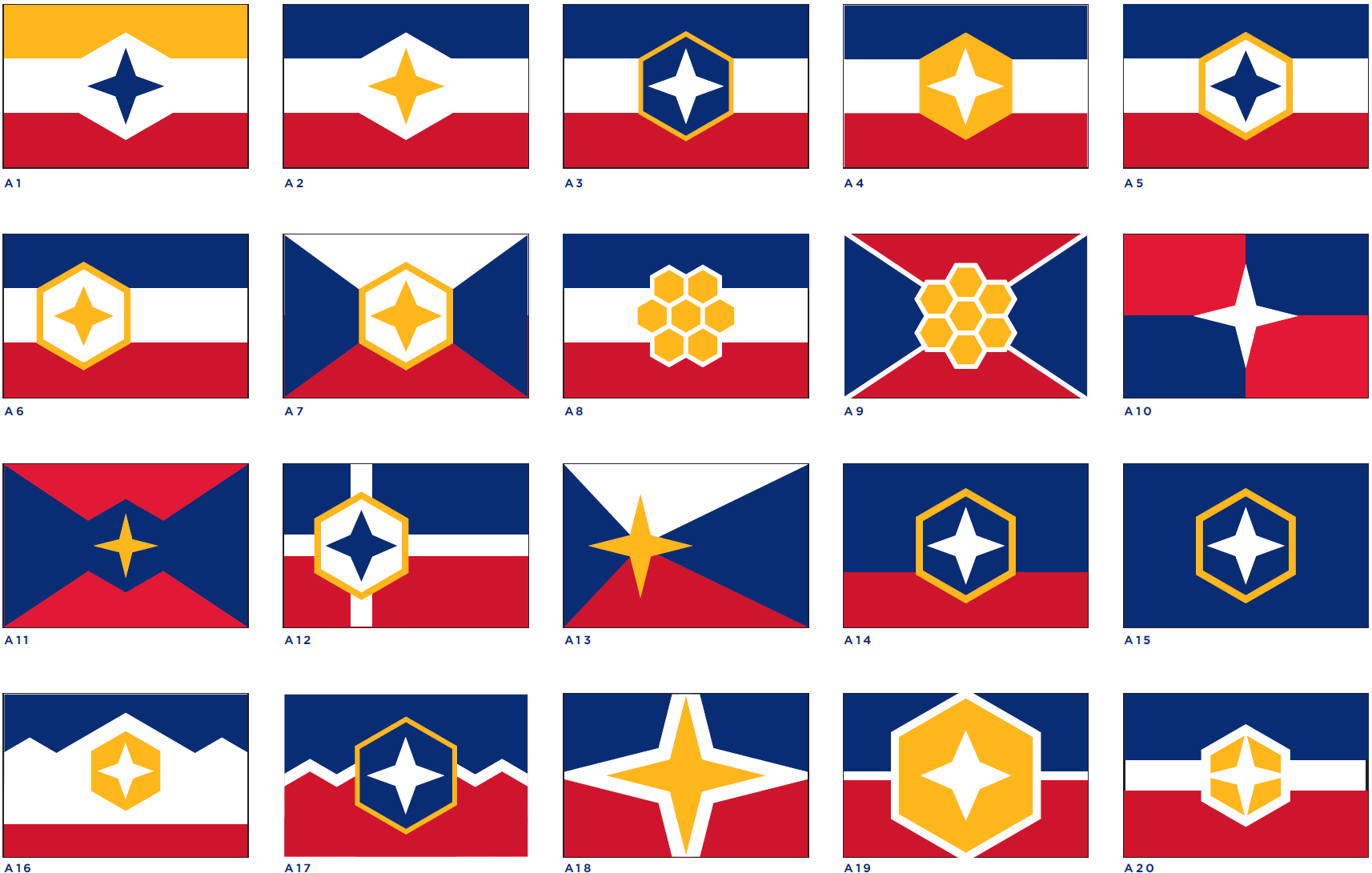

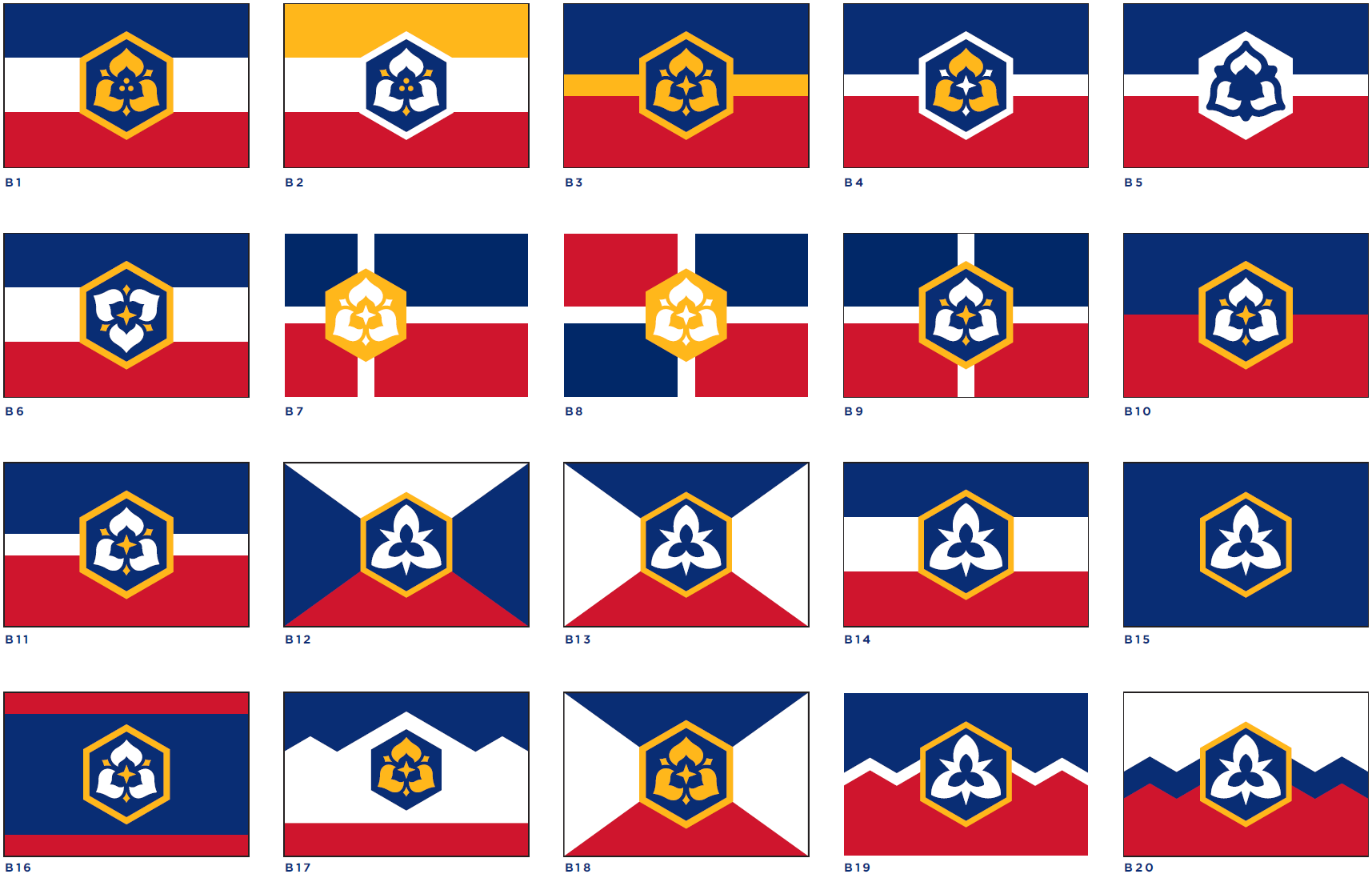

In 2021, Senator McCay sponsored a bill to create a task force to redesign the Utah state flag. The bill also designated an official flag to commemorate the 125th anniversary of Utah's statehood. The bill passed in the House and the Senate and was signed into law by Governor Spencer Cox.

Commemorative Flag of Utah (2021)

In 2022, the Utah State Flag Task Force accepted design submissions from the public. 5,703 designs were submitted, 2,500 of which were submitted by students. In September, 20 semifinalist designs were announced and Utahns were asked to submit their feedback. During the month-long comment period, 44,000 survey responses were given.

Other Utah State Flag Task Force finalists

On November 10, 2022, the Task Force submitted a final proposal to the Utah State Legislature for adoption as the official state flag. On January 18, 2023, the Utah Senate Business and Labor Committee voted 6–1 to advance the flag to the State Senate, with McCay saying he hoped the new flag design would reach Spencer Cox's desk by March 3.

The Utah State Flag Task Force's final proposal with eight-pointed star

On January 30, 2023, the State Senate approved the bill 17–10, which advanced to the State House of Representatives for approval. However, the flag was slightly modified; the eight-pointed star, intended to represent the eight federally recognized tribal nations in Utah, was replaced by a five-pointed star after an Indigenous constituent expressed concern that it looked like an asterisk from a distance. The five pointed star, in addition to the five newly added mountain peaks in the background, were added to represent the five original tribal nations of Utah (Navajo, Shoshone, Goshute, Paiute and Ute).

Final chosen design with five-pointed star

On March 2, 2023, the Utah House of Representatives approved the bill 40–35, and the State Senate passed the concurrence vote 19–9–1, sending the bill to the governor's desk for signing. The bill was signed by Governor Cox on March 21, 2023, along with an executive order formalizing the change.

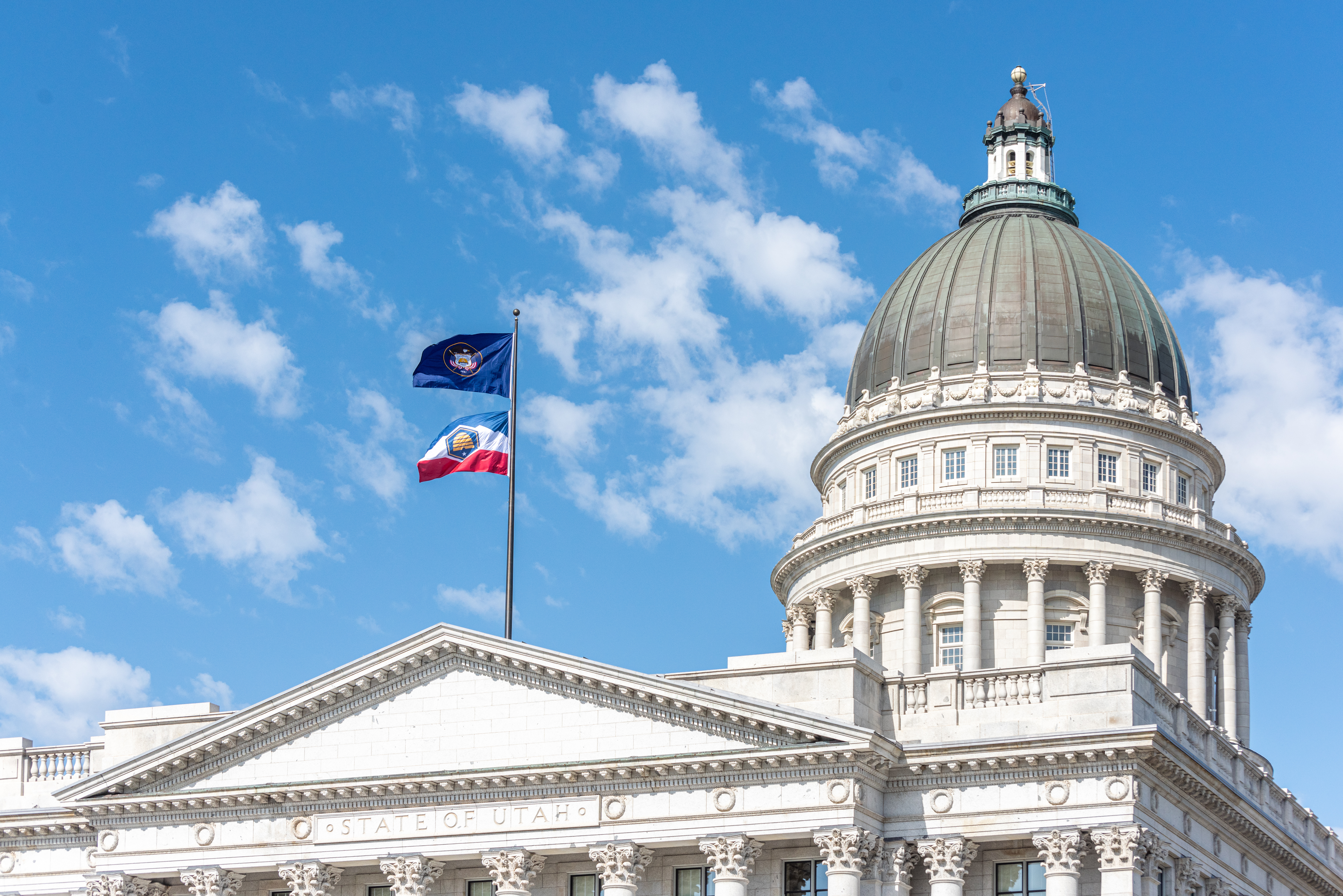
The historic state flag (top) and the new state flag (bottom) flying over the Utah State Capitol in 2023, prior to the new flag's official adoption.

The bill—and the new flag—went into effect on March 9, 2024, thus providing a one-year phase-in period to gradually transition to the new flag. The bill also designates the prior design as the official historic flag which may continue to be used by all. The executive order mandates that the historic state flag be flown above the state capitol every day of the year and once the bill goes into effect, the two flags should be flown from different flagpoles on capitol grounds. The order also petitions the legislature to amend the bill to have the new flag flown beneath the historic state flag when flown on the same flagpole, rather than above.

A public opinion poll conducted by the Hinckley Institute of Politics in March 2023 found that 48% of respondents supported the new flag, 35% opposed it, and 17% did not know.

On May 17, 2023, the Utah State Capitol raised the new flag for the first time.

==== Attempts to remove the 2024 flag ====
Opponents of the new flag announced a campaign to initiate a 2023 ballot referendum on the adoption of the flag, hoping to retain the old flag, in spite of language in the bill that retains the historic state flag. The signature campaign failed, ultimately receiving only 21,030 verified signatures, with official verification being halted after fewer than 50,000 of the 134,298 required signatures were submitted to county clerks.

Flag opponents launched a second signature campaign to put the issue on the 2024 ballot as an initiative. That campaign also failed, gathering 99,125 signatures. (The lieutenant governor's office had only validated 81,992 before the deadline, the remaining 17,133 signatures left unvalidated would not have been enough to cross the threshold of 134,298 signatures to qualify for the ballot.) On February 8, 2024, a group linked to the campaign filed a federal lawsuit against the lieutenant governor, alleging that ten separate provisions of the citizen initiative process that the legislature created were unconstitutional. The group sought injunctive relief for the alleged violations, but were denied on all counts. Subsequently, the group withdrew the lawsuit two days later.

During Utah's 2024 legislative session, Representative Phil Lyman put forward House Bill 436 in the Utah House of Representatives. The bill would have repealed the new flag, but it failed to advance out of committee.

== Flag of the National Guard ==
During the Territorial days the militia carried their own flags. The flags were not standardized; they often contained religious symbols and mottos of their faith, with most of the flags being based on the American flag. The flags carried by the militia were usually made by locals of the community.

Utah National Guard currently carries the state flag. The first regimental flag used by the National Guard was in 1894 but its design is unknown. Before 1895 regiments carried their own distinctive flags, but after 1895 the regimental flag was standardized. The size was of the flag was 6 feet by 6 feet. All other distinctive regimental flag were abosted.

During the Spanish-American War, several Utah units played a role, with some seeing action in the conflict. The Utah Light Artillery took part in the Battle of Manila and stayed unit August of 1899. The regiment was given a 2 guidons for batteries A & B by Governor Wells. The Governor was planning on giving them an old Mormon Battalion flag from the 1840s. The guidons bore a red field with 2 crossed Yellow cannons with the inscription "U.U.S.V" and the battery's name. After the war the guidons came back torn up with the colors on them being faded. Company I of the 2nd United States Volunteer Cavalry also known as "Torrey's Roughriders," composed mainly of men from Utah, they served in Florida. The company was given a guidon by the Governor. After their service was up the flag was sent back to the Governor.

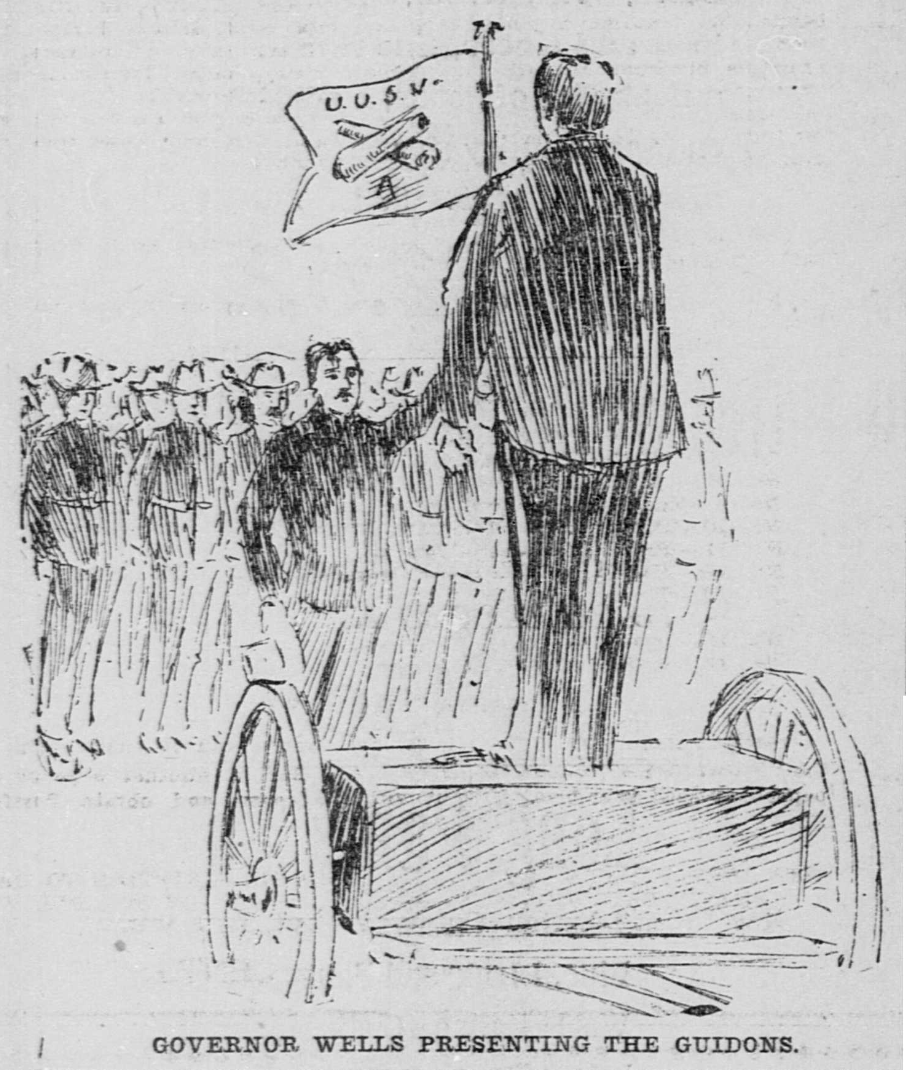
The Utah Light Artillery guidon for battery A, 1898

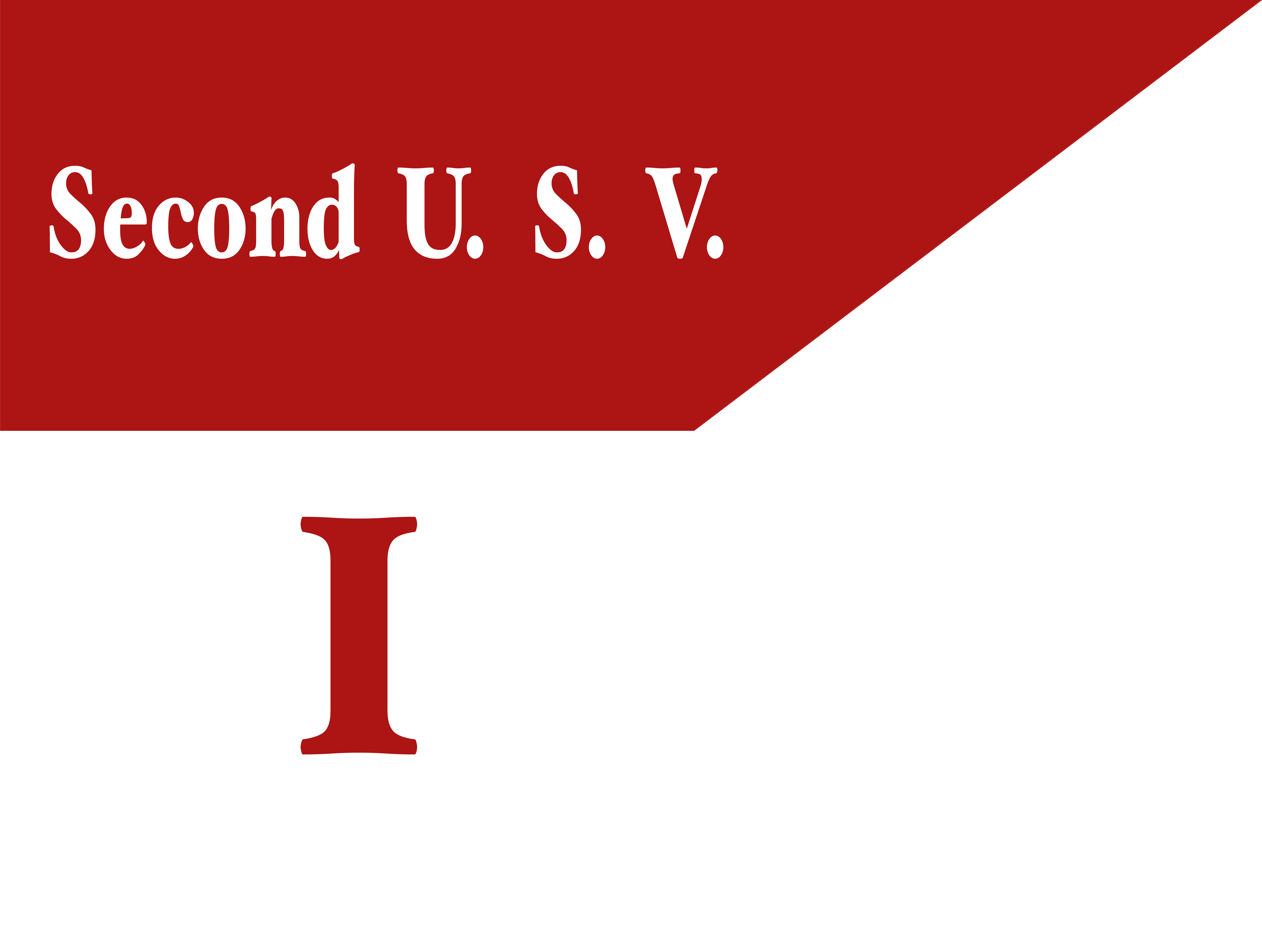
Digital reconstruction of the guidon carried by Company I of 2nd United States Volunteer Cavalry, 1898

=== 1905 flag ===
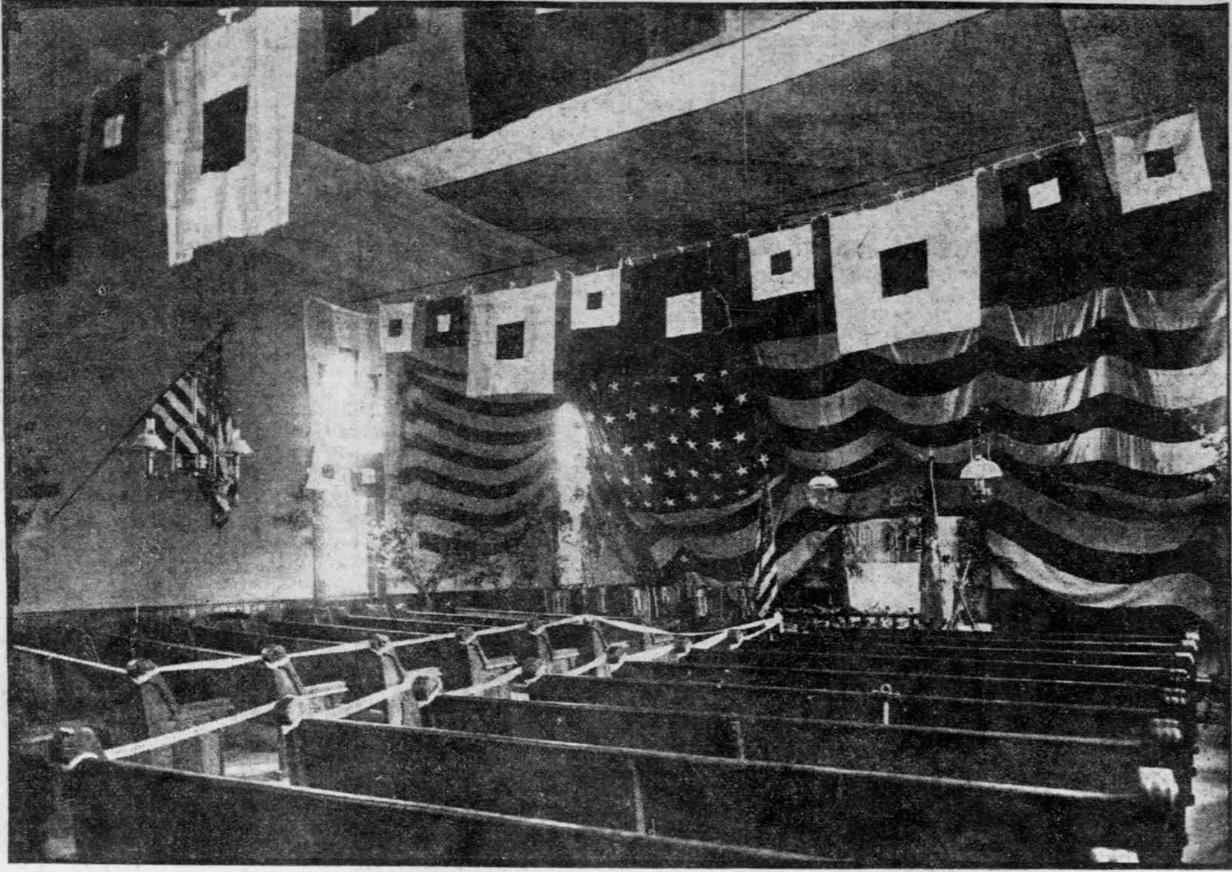
Military wedding at Fort Douglas with the regimental flag at altar, 1905

Digital reconstruction of the 1905 flag

In August of 1905 Adjutant General Geoghegan and Colonel Lund adopted a regimental flag to be used by the state. The flag was described: "...The field is blue silk with gold fringe and cords and tassels. The coat, of-arms and motto of the state in colors, on a white background, occupies the center of the field of blue..."

=== 1st Utah field artillery ===
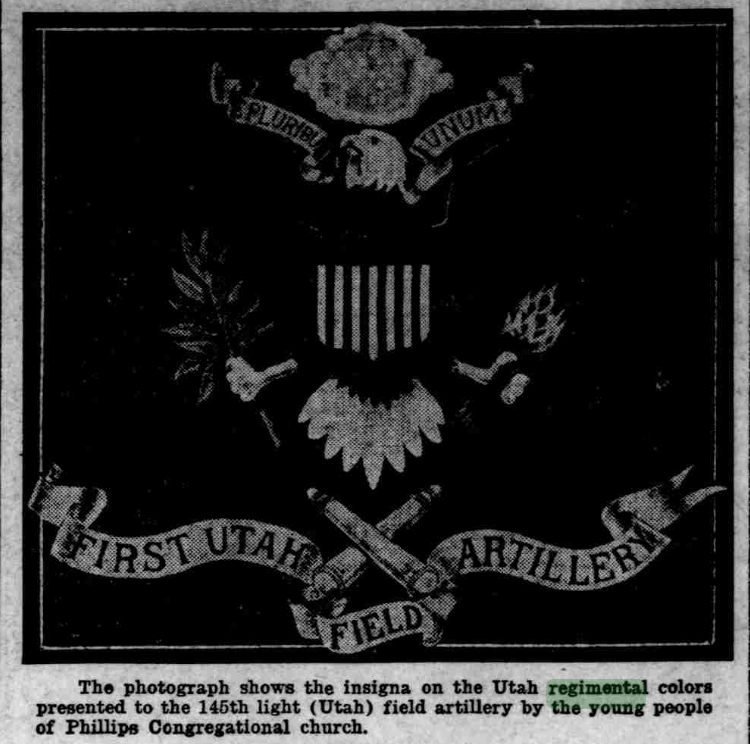
Flag carried by the 1st Utah field artillery during World War 1

During World War I the War Department ordered the state to organized regiment of light artillery. The regiment was designated 1st Utah Field Artillery Regiment. On October 9, 1917 the regimental flag was presented to the regiment by Youth Group from Phillips Congregation Church in Salt Lake City, with the Governor in attendance. They were also given guidons for each of the batteries.

In 1918 a party was being held at Fort Douglas between officers and their wives. During the party they carried out a regimental flag described as being blue and Yellow. It is unknown what regiment it belonged to.

=== 1924 flag ===
In 1924 the National Guard adopted a new design for their regimental flag. The flag was similar to the state flag but with a white state seal and a red scroll below it. The flag were describe as: "...Regimental colors, to be blue with the arms of the state embroidered in white silk on the center, underneath this a red scroll with the number and name of the regiment, the fringe yellow, cords and tassels blue and white intermixed..."

== Flag of the governor ==
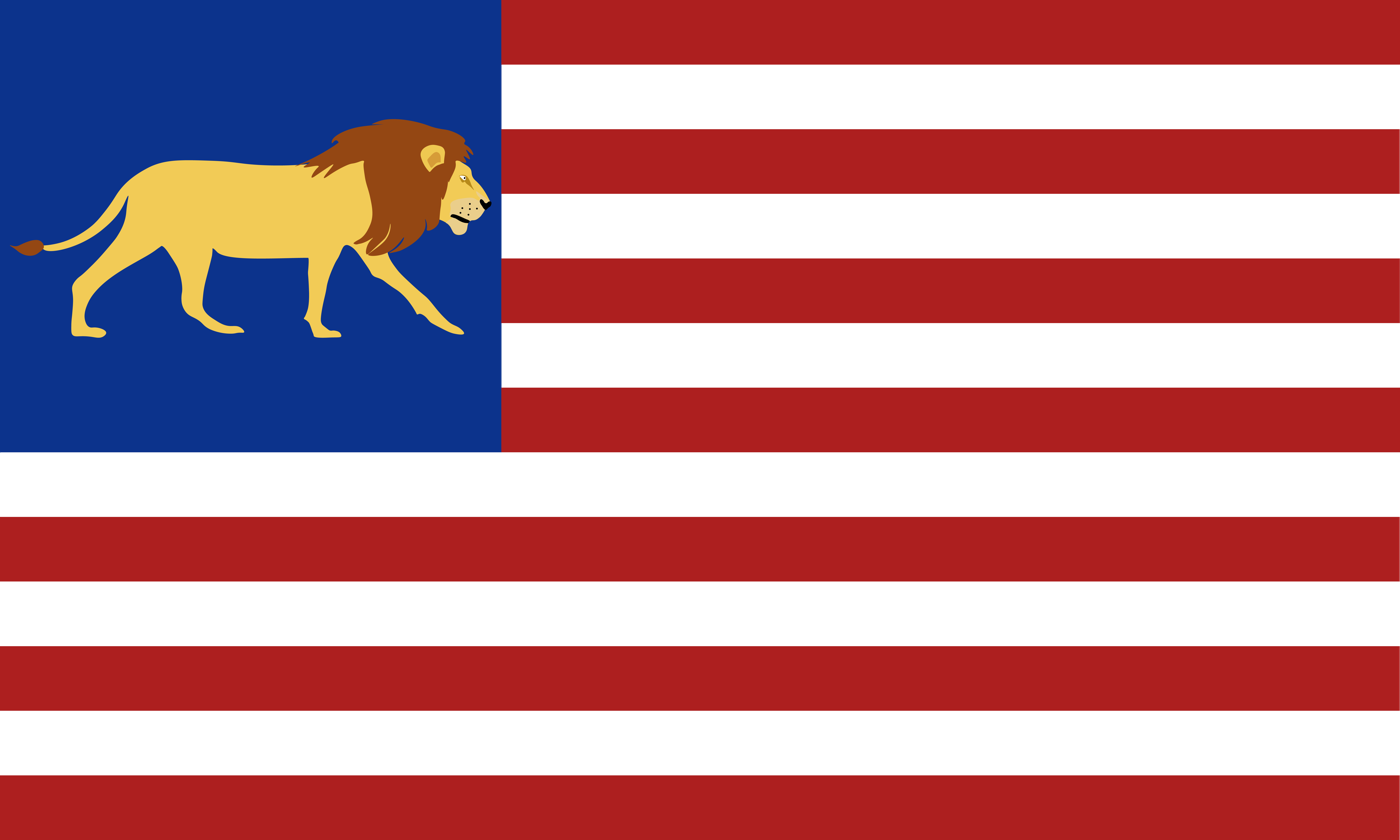
Reconstruction of Brigham Young's personal flag

Utah does not currently have a flag that represents the governor. The first governor flag was used in 1854 by Brigham Young at his residence. It was described as an American flag but with a lion in its canton. The lion was in reference to Brigham's nickname, "The Lion of the Lord."

== See also ==
- Symbols of the State of Utah
