= Seal of Utah =

Official government emblem of the U.S. state of Utah

Great Seal of the State of Utah

Versions
- Variant

- Coat of arms
- Armiger: State of Utah
- Adopted: April 3, 1896
- Motto: Industry

The Great Seal of the State of Utah was adopted on April 3, 1896, at the first regular session of the Legislature (January, February, March, April 1896). The original seal was designed by Harry Edwards & C. M. Jackson and cost $65.00, equivalent to $2,516 in 2025. The great seal is described in Utah Code Annotated, 1953, Volume 7a, section 67-2-9 as follows:

"The Great Seal of the State of Utah shall be two and one-half inches in diameter, and of the following device; the center a shield and perched thereon an American Eagle with outstretching wings; the top of the shield pierced by six arrows crosswise; under the arrows the motto "INDUSTRY"; beneath the motto a beehive, on either side growing sego lilies; below the figures "1847"; on each side of the shield an American Flag.; encircling all, near the outer edge of the seal, beginning at the lower left-hand portion, the words, "THE GREAT SEAL OF THE STATE OF UTAH", with the figures "1896" at the base."

== Seal of the governor ==
There is also an official seal of the governor of Utah. Borrowing most of the same symbolism from the state seal, the Governor's seal includes Roman numerals at the bottom, which represent the Governor himself, and this changes with every new Governor. Each Governor therefore has a seal unique to themselves and their administration. The Roman numerals are currently "XVIII", representing Spencer Cox, who is the 18th governor of Utah since statehood. The seal was designed after the California Governor's Seal by Ronald L. Fox of Salt Lake City, Utah in 1992.

== Enhanced variant ==
An artist at the Colonial Flag Company, produced the artwork for the corrected Utah State flag used during the Legislative process. The flag was drawn following the legal description and using the colors of the flag made for presentation to the USS Utah (BB-31) in 1912. Although colors were not included in the law describing the Utah State Flag as adopted in 1912 and amended in 1913, they were described in other state documents. Utah officials asked that those colors be used. However, they declined to include an illustration with the House Concurrent Resolution, saying that was not possible.

As with many flags with seals and coats of arms, there is room for artistic interpretation while still following correct designs. Paul Swenson, who as the President of Colonial Flag Company had paid for the prototype design, felt the eagle as shown in that design was weak and unattractive. He had graphic artist Perry Van Schelt strengthen the design while following the same description and using the same colors as employed in the prototype. Advisors in the project included John Hartvigsen, David Rindlisbach and Ronald L. Fox, Fox suggested the flag on the seal would have 45 stars divided between the two U.S. Flags shown on the seal, Utah was the 45th State. Both the prototype and the enhance designs are correct and follow the law and intent of the 2011 legislation. Only a few hundred flags were ordered using the prototype design, and most flags now being made and sold use the enhanced design, but legally flag manufacturers are free to use either version.

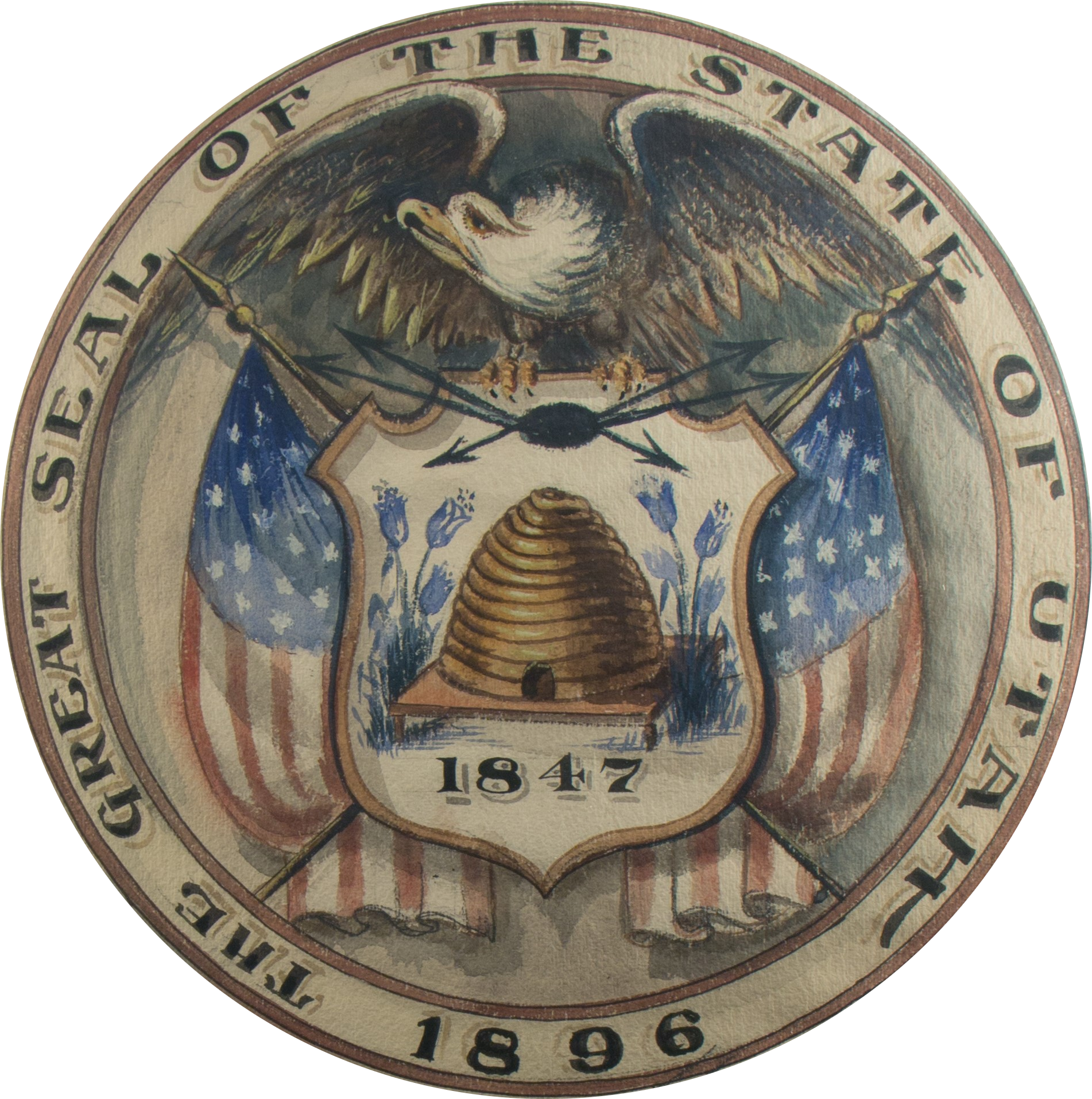
Original seal from 1896, lacking the "Industry" motto.

Variant used from 1903–1913 from the Flag

Seal used up until 2011

Seal of Utah (enhanced variant)

Coat of arms of Utah (enhanced variant)

Historic Flag of Utah (enhanced variant)

Seal of the governor of Utah (enhanced variant)

Seal of Utah (alternative, enhanced variant)

== Symbolism ==
Symbol	Meaning
American eagle	National bird
Shield	Common defense
Industry	Motto
Beehive	State emblem
1896	Statehood established
1847	Pioneers arrived
Sego Lily	State flower
U.S. flags	National government
