= 2026 Utah Senate election =

- November 3, 2026

15 of the 29 seats in the Utah Senate 15 seats needed for a majority
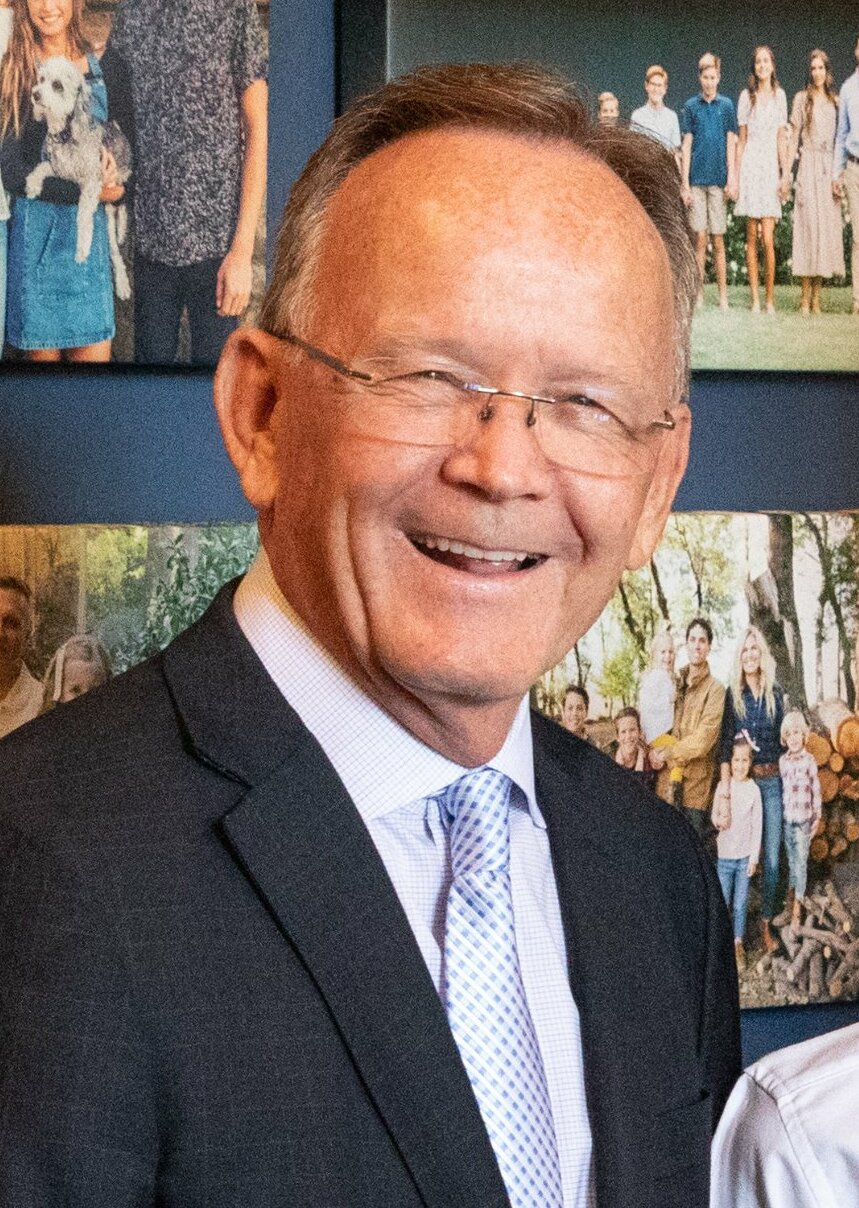

	Majority party	Minority party	Third party
Leader	Stuart Adams (lost re-nomination)	Luz Escamilla	Emily Buss
Party	Republican	Democratic	Forward
Leader's seat	7th–Salt Lake	10th–Salt Lake	11th–West Valley
Last election	23 seats; 68.0%	6 seats; 22.8%	0 seats; 0.0%
Seats before	22	6	1
Seats after	21	8	0
Seats up	10	4	1
- Map of incumbents: Republican incumbent Democratic incumbent Utah Forward incumbent No election
Senate President before election
Stuart Adams
Republican
Elected Senate President
TBD

The 2026 Utah Senate election were held on November 3, 2026, as part of the 2026 United States elections. Fifteen of the twenty-nine seats in the Utah Senate are up for election to the 67th Legislature. The elections will coincide with elections for other offices in Utah, including for U.S. House and the state house. Newly-elected senators will take office on January 1, 2027.

The Republicans currently hold a supermajority in the chamber, controlling twenty-two of the twenty-nine seats. The Democrats hold the second-most seats with six, and the Utah Forward has held one seat since Senator Daniel Thatcher from Salt Lake County switched from the Republican Party during the 2025 legislative session. Thatcher is the first third-party state senator in Utah since Republican senator Mark B. Madsen switched to the Libertarian Party in 2016. Thatcher announced his resignation in October 2025, with the Utah Forward Party electing Emily Buss to fill his seat.

Districts 1, 5, 6, 7, 9, 11, 12, 13, 14, 18, 19, 20, 21, 23, and 28 will be up for election in 2026.

== Retirements ==
=== Republicans ===
1. District 5: Ann Millner is retiring.
2. District 6: Jerry Stevenson is retiring.

=== Democrats ===
1. District 13: Nate Blouin is retiring to run for Congress in Utah's 1st congressional district.

== Predictions ==
Source	Ranking	As of
Sabato's Crystal Ball	Safe R	January 22, 2026
State Navigate	Solid R	August 27, 2026

== Partisan background ==
In the 2024 presidential election in Utah, the Republican nominee Donald Trump won twenty-two state senate districts, while the Democratic nominee Kamala Harris won seven districts.

2024 Presidential results by Senate district: Trump: 50–60%; 60–70%; 70–80%; 80–90%; Harris: 40–50%; 50–60%; 60–70%; 70–80%

=== By seat ===
This table lists which presidential candidate won each district in 2024 that is up for election in 2026.

District	County(ies) represented	Incumbent	2024 Pres. margin
District 1	Box Elder, Cache, Tooele	Scott Sandall (R)	R+54.8
District 5	Davis, Morgan, Weber	Ann Millner (R)	R+11.8
District 6	Davis	Jerry Stevenson (R)	R+33.9
District 7	Salt Lake	J. Stuart Adams (R)	R+25.2
District 9	Salt Lake	Jen Plumb (D)	D+56.7
District 11	Salt Lake, Tooele	Emily Buss (FWD)	R+34.9
District 12	Salt Lake	Karen Kwan (D)	D+6.4
District 13	Salt Lake	Nate Blouin (D)	D+39.0
District 14	Salt Lake	Stephanie Pitcher (D)	D+31.6
District 18	Salt Lake, Utah	Daniel McCay (R)	R+30.6
District 19	Salt Lake	Kirk Cullimore Jr. (R)	R+8.9
District 20	Daggett, Duchesne, Summit, Uintah, Wasatch	Ronald Winterton (R)	R+35.2
District 21	Utah	Brady Brammer (R)	R+42.6
District 23	Utah	Keith Grover (R)	R+31.0
District 28	Beaver, Iron, Washington	Evan Vickers (R)	R+58.5

== Summary ==
Summary of the 2026 Utah Senate election results
Party	Candidates	Votes	%	Seats				
Party	Candidates	Votes	%	Before 66th Leg.	Up	Won	After 67th Leg.	+/–
Republican	14		%	22	10			Steady
Democratic	13		%	6	4			Steady
Forward	7		%	1	1			Steady
Constitution	1		%	0	0			Steady
Total			100.0%	29	15		29	Steady

== District 1 ==
District 1 election
Nominee	Scott Sandall (incumbent)	Claudia Bigler
Party	Republican	Democratic
Incumbent Senator
Scott Sandall
Republican

=== Republican primary ===
==== Nominee ====
- Scott Sandall, incumbent state senator

==== Out at convention ====
- Fred Hayes

=== Democratic nominee ===
- Claudia Bigler

=== Forward nominee ===
- Julie Quinlan

=== General election ===
==== Results ====
Utah Senate district 1 election, 2026
Party	Candidate	Votes	%
Republican	Scott Sandall (incumbent)		
Democratic	Claudia Bigler		
Forward	Julie Quinlan		

== District 5 ==
District 5 election
Nominee	Jill Koford	Christina Hernandez
Party	Republican	Democratic
Incumbent Senator
Ann Millner
Republican

=== Republican nominee ===
- Jill Koford, state representative from the 10th district (2025–present)

=== Democratic primary ===
==== Nominee ====
- Christina Hernandez

==== Out at convention ====
- Dakota Wurth

==== Endorsements ====
Dakota Wurth

Organizations

- LGBTQ Victory Fund

=== General election ===
==== Results ====
Utah Senate district 5 election, 2026
Party	Candidate	Votes	%
Democratic	Christina Hernandez		
Republican	Jill Koford		

== District 6 ==
District 6 election

Nominee	Tami Tran	Jared Neal
Party	Republican	Democratic
Incumbent Senator
Jerry Stevenson
Republican

=== Republican primary ===
==== Nominee ====
- Tami Tran, mayor of Kaysville, Utah

==== Eliminated in primary ====
- Robert Wanlass

==== Polling ====
Poll source	Date(s) administered	Sample size (Note: Key: A – all adults RV – registered voters LV – likely voters V – unclear)	Margin of error	Tami Tran	Robert Wanlass	Undecided
State Navigate/Doers Network	June 4–7, 2026	326 (LV)	± 5.4%	56% (Note: With voters who lean towards a given candidate)	20%	24%
State Navigate/Doers Network	June 4–7, 2026	326 (LV)	± 5.4%	50%	18%	32%
State Navigate/Doers Network	April 10–12, 2026	401 (LV)	± 5.1%	28%	12%	60%
State Navigate/Doers Network	April 10–12, 2026	401 (LV)	± 5.1%	23%	7%	71%

==== Results ====
Utah Senate district 6 Republican primary, 2026
Party	Candidate	Votes	%
Republican	Tami Tran	8,245	70.61
Republican	Robert Wanlass	3,431	29.39

=== Democratic nominee ===
- Jared Neal

=== Forward nominee ===
- Josh Smith

=== General election ===
==== Results ====
Utah Senate district 6 election, 2026
Party	Candidate	Votes	%
Republican	Tami Tran		
Democratic	Jared Neal		
Forward	Josh Smith		

== District 7 ==
District 7 election
Nominee	Stephanie Hollist	Garret Rushforth
Party	Republican	Democratic
Incumbent Senator
Stuart Adams
Republican

=== Republican primary ===
==== Nominee ====
- Stephanie Hollist

==== Eliminated in primary ====
- Stuart Adams, incumbent state senator
- Braden Hess

==== Out at convention ====
- Jennifer Garner

==== Results ====
Utah Senate district 7 Republican primary, 2026
Party	Candidate	Votes	%
Republican	Stephanie Hollist	7,688	43.10
Republican	Stuart Adams (incumbent)	6,088	34.13
Republican	Braden Hess	4,063	22.78

=== Democratic nominee ===
- Garret Rushforth

=== Constitution nominee ===
- Jeffrey Ostler

=== General election ===
==== Results ====
Utah Senate district 7 election, 2026
Party	Candidate	Votes	%
Republican	Stephanie Hollist		
Democratic	Garret Rushforth		
Constitution	Jeffrey Ostler		

== District 9 ==
District 9 election

Nominee	Jen Plumb (incumbent)	Thaddeus A. Evans
Party	Democratic	Republican
Incumbent Senator
Jen Plumb
Democratic

=== Democratic nominee ===
- Jen Plumb, incumbent state senator

=== Republican nominee ===
- Thaddeus A. Evans

=== Forward nominee ===
- J. Lowry Snow

=== General election ===
==== Results ====
Utah Senate district 9 election, 2026
Party	Candidate	Votes	%
Democratic	Jen Plumb		
Republican	Thaddeus A. Evans		
Forward	J. Lowry Snow		

== District 11 ==
District 11 election

Nominee	Emily Buss	Brooks Benson
Party	Forward	Republican
Incumbent Senator
Emily Buss
Forward

=== Forward nominee ===
- Emily Buss, incumbent state senator

=== Republican primary ===
==== Nominee ====
- Brooks Benson

==== Out at convention ====
- John Knotwell, former state representative from the 52nd district (2013–2019)
- Chris Sloan

=== Democratic nominee ===
- MacKenzie Miller (withdrawn)

=== General election ===
==== Results ====
Utah Senate district 11 election, 2026
Party	Candidate	Votes	%
Forward	Emily Buss (incumbent)		
Republican	Brooks Benson		

== District 12 ==
District 12 election
Nominee	Karen Kwan (incumbent)	Deidre Tyler
Party	Democratic	Republican
Incumbent Senator
Karen Kwan
Democratic

=== Democratic nominee ===
- Karen Kwan, incumbent state senator

=== Republican nominee ===
- Deidre Tyler

=== General election ===
==== Results ====
Utah Senate district 12 election, 2026
Party	Candidate	Votes	%
Democratic	Karen Kwan		
Republican	Deidre Tyler		

== District 13 ==
District 13 election
Nominee	Silvia Catten	Ryan L. Mahoney
Party	Democratic	Republican
Incumbent Senator
Nate Blouin
Democratic

=== Democratic primary ===
==== Nominee ====
- Silvia Catten

==== Eliminated in primary ====
- Evan Done
- Taylor J. Paden

==== Out at convention ====
- Richard T. Whitney

==== Declined ====
- Nate Blouin, incumbent state senator (ran for U.S. House)

==== Endorsements ====
Evan Done

Organizations

- Advocates for Trans Equality
- LGBTQ Victory Fund
Taylor Paden

Organizations

- Democratic Socialists of America
- Salt Lake City Democratic Socialists of America

==== Results ====
Utah Senate district 13 Democratic primary, 2026
Party	Candidate	Votes	%
Democratic	Silvia Catten	3,924	44.13
Democratic	Evan Done	2,921	32.85
Democratic	Taylor J. Paden	2,047	23.02

=== Republican nominee ===
- Ryan L. Mahoney

=== Forward nominee ===
- Colin Smith

=== General election ===
==== Results ====
Utah Senate district 13 election, 2026
Party	Candidate	Votes	%
Democratic	Silvia Catten		
Republican	Ryan L. Mahoney		
Forward	Colin Smith		

== District 14 ==
District 14 Democratic primary election
Nominee	Stephanie Pitcher	Tyler Khater
Party	Democratic	Democratic
Incumbent Senator
Stephanie Pitcher
Democratic

=== Democratic primary ===
==== Nominee ====
- Stephanie Pitcher, incumbent state senator

==== Out at convention ====
- Tayler Khater

==== Results ====
Utah Senate district 14 Democratic primary, 2026
Party	Candidate	Votes	%
Democratic	Stephanie Pitcher (incumbent)	10,070	77.61
Democratic	Tayler Khater	2,905	22.39

=== General election ===
==== Results ====
Utah Senate district 14 election, 2026
Party	Candidate	Votes	%
Democratic	Stephanie Pitcher (incumbent)		

== District 18 ==
District 18 election
Nominee	Doug Fiefia	A. Dane Anderson
Party	Republican	Democratic
Incumbent Senator
Daniel McCay
Republican

=== Republican primary ===
==== Nominee ====
- Doug Fiefia, state representative from the 48th district (2025–present)

==== Eliminated in primary ====
- Daniel McCay, incumbent state senator

==== Out at convention ====
- Tracie Halvorsen

==== Polling ====
Poll source	Date(s) administered	Sample size	Margin of error	Doug Fiefia	Daniel McCay	Undecided
State Navigate/Doers Network	June 11–14, 2026	366 (LV)	± 5.1%	63%	22%	14%
State Navigate/Doers Network	June 11–14, 2026	366 (LV)	± 5.1%	62%	20%	18%
State Navigate/Doers Network	May 5–7, 2026	497 (LV)	± 4.4%	39%	21%	40%
State Navigate/Doers Network	May 5–7, 2026	497 (LV)	± 4.4%	33%	16%	51%

==== Results ====
Utah Senate district 18 Republican primary, 2026
Party	Candidate	Votes	%
Republican	Doug Fiefia	6,986	69.51
Republican	Daniel McCay (incumbent)	3,064	30.49

=== Democratic nominee ===
- A. Dane Anderson

=== General election ===
==== Results ====
Utah Senate district 18 election, 2026
Party	Candidate	Votes	%
Republican	Doug Fiefia		
Democratic	A. Dane Anderson		

== District 19 ==
District 19 election
Nominee	Shana Anderson	Kirk Cullimore Jr.
Party	Democratic	Republican
Incumbent Senator
Kirk Cullimore Jr.
Republican

=== Republican nominee ===
- Kirk Cullimore Jr., incumbent state senator

=== Democratic primary ===
==== Nominee ====
- Shana Anderson, U.S. Army veteran

==== Out at convention ====
- Salvador Giove

=== General election ===
==== Results ====
Utah Senate district 19 election, 2026
Party	Candidate	Votes	%
Democratic	Shana Anderson		
Republican	Kirk Cullimore Jr. (incumbent)		
Democratic gain from Republican			

== District 20 ==
District 20 election
Nominee	Ronald Winterton	Annette McRae
Party	Republican	Forward
Incumbent Senator
Ronald Winterton
Republican

=== Republican nominee ===
- Ronald Winterton, incumbent state senator

=== Forward nominee ===
- Annette McRae

=== General election ===
==== Results ====
Utah Senate district 20 election, 2026
Party	Candidate	Votes	%
Republican	Ronald Winterton (incumbent)		
Forward	Annette McRae		

== District 21 ==
District 21 election
Nominee	Brady Brammer	Kandee Myers
Party	Republican	Democratic
Incumbent Senator
Brady Brammer
Republican

=== Republican primary ===
==== Nominee ====
- Brady Brammer, incumbent state senator

==== Eliminated in primary ====
- Kelly Smith

==== Withdrawn ====
- Seth Stewart

==== Polling ====
Poll source	Date(s) administered	Sample size	Margin of error	Brady Brammer	Kelly Smith	Undecided
State Navigate/Doers Network	June 11–14, 2026	374 (LV)	± 5.1%	37%	44%	20%
State Navigate/Doers Network	June 11–14, 2026	374 (LV)	± 5.1%	36%	41%	23%
State Navigate/Doers Network	May 5–7, 2026	781 (LV)	± 3.5%	21%	18%	59%
State Navigate/Doers Network	May 5–7, 2026	781 (LV)	± 3.5%	17%	15%	68%

==== Results ====
Utah Senate district 21 Republican primary, 2026
Party	Candidate	Votes	%
Republican	Brady Brammer (incumbent)	7,947	56.85
Republican	Kelly Smith	6,033	43.15

=== Democratic nominee ===
- Kandee Myers

=== Forward nominee ===
- Wayne Woodfield

=== General election ===
==== Results ====
Utah Senate district 21 election, 2026
Party	Candidate	Votes	%
Republican	Brady Brammer (incumbent)		
Democratic	Kandee Myers		
Forward	Wayne Woodfield		

== District 23 ==
District 23 election
Nominee	Keith Grover	Tucker Smith
Party	Republican	Democratic
Incumbent Senator
Keith Grover
Republican

=== Republican nominee ===
- Keith Grover, incumbent state senator

=== Democratic nominee ===
- Tucker Smith

=== General election ===
==== Results ====
Utah Senate district 23 election, 2026
Party	Candidate	Votes	%
Republican	Keith Grover (incumbent)		
Democratic	Tucker Smith		

== District 28 ==
District 28 election
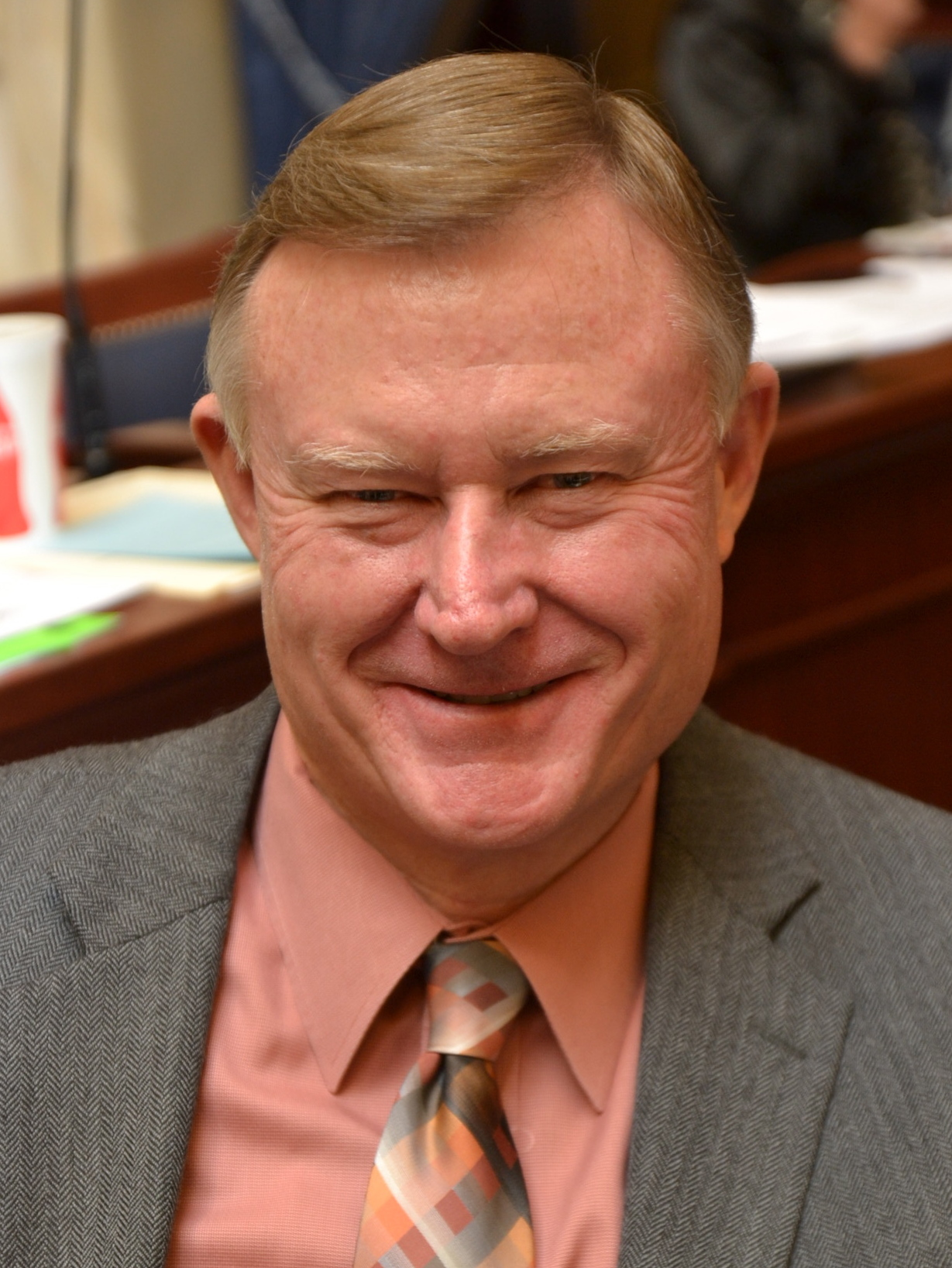

Nominee	Evan Vickers	Richard S. Robillard
Party	Republican	Democratic
Incumbent Senator
Evan Vickers
Republican

=== Republican nominee ===
- Evan Vickers, incumbent state senator

=== Democratic nominee ===
- Richard S. Robillard

=== General election ===
==== Results ====
Utah Senate district 28 election, 2026
Party	Candidate	Votes	%
Republican	Evan Vickers (incumbent)		
Democratic	Richard S. Robillard		
