= 2024 Utah Republican presidential caucuses =

- March 5, 2024

40 Republican National Convention delegates

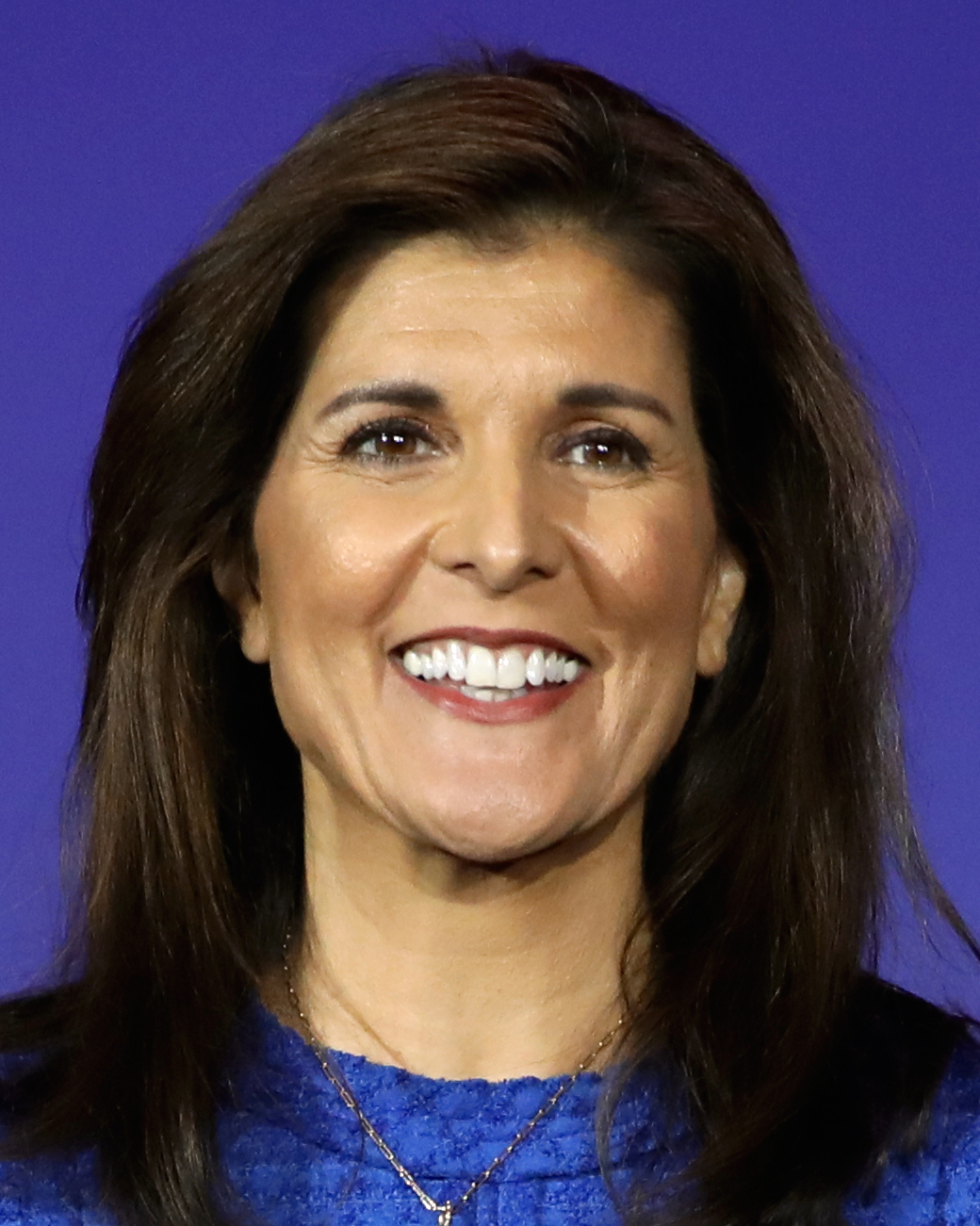
Candidate	Donald Trump	Nikki Haley
Home state	Florida	South Carolina
Delegate count	40	0
Popular vote	48,350	36,621
Percentage	56.35%	42.68%
County results
Trump
50 – 60%
60 – 70%
70 – 80%
80 – 90%
>90%
Haley
50 – 60%

The 2024 Utah Republican presidential caucuses were held on March 5, 2024, as part of the Republican Party primaries for the 2024 presidential election. 40 delegates to the 2024 Republican National Convention were allocated on a winner-take-most basis. The contest was held on Super Tuesday alongside primaries in 14 other states. Donald Trump won most of the counties along with all 40 delegates, but Nikki Haley won Salt Lake and Davis counties.

== Controversy ==
Technological and staffing issues led to Utah being the last state to report Super Tuesday results. Voters faced difficulties in casting their vote and some gave up on the process.

== Endorsements ==
Ron DeSantis (withdrawn)

State executive official

- John Dougall, State Auditor (2013–present)

State senators

- ~~Evan Vickers, District 28 (2013–present); Majority Leader (2019–present)~~ (switched endorsement to Haley)
- Scott Sandall, District 1 (2023–present) and District 17 (2019–2023)
- Todd Weiler, District 8 (2023–present) and District 23 (2012–2023)
- Lincoln Fillmore, District 17 (2023–present) and District 10 (2016–2023)
- Daniel McCay, District 18 (2023–present) and District 11 (2019–2023)
- Kirk Cullimore Jr., District 19 (2023–present) and District 9 (2019–2023)
- Jake Anderegg, District 22 (2023–present) and District 13 (2017–2023)
- Curt Bramble, District 24 (2023–present) and District 16 (2001–2023)
- ~~Mike McKell, District 25 (2023–present) and District 7 (2021–2023)~~ (switched endorsement to Haley)
- Derrin Owens, District 27 (2023–present) and District 24 (2021–2023)

State representatives

- Mike Schultz, District 12 (2015–present); Majority Leader (2021–present)
- Jefferson Moss, District 51 (2023–present) and District 2 (2017–2023); Majority Whip (2021–present)
- Dan Johnson, District 3 (2023–present) and District 4 (2019–2023)
- Kera Birkeland, District 4 (2023–present) and District 53 (2020–2023)
- Casey Snider, District 5 (2019–present)
- Ryan Wilcox, District 7 (2009–2014 and 2021–present)
- Karen M. Peterson, District 13 (2022–present)
- Karianne Lisonbee, District 14 (2017–present)
- Paul Cutler, District 18 (2023–present)
- Timothy Hawkes, District 18 (2015–2022)
- Raymond Ward, District 19 (2015–present)
- Melissa Garff Ballard, District 20 (2019–present)
- Ken Ivory, District 39 (2023–present) and District 47 (2011–2019 and 2021–2023)
- Robert Spendlove, District 42 (2023–present) and District 49 (2014–2023)
- Jordan Teuscher, District 44 (2023–present) and District 42 (2021–2023)
- Susan Pulsipher, District 45 (2023–present) and District 50 (2017–2023)
- Candice Pierucci, District 49 (2023–present) and District 52 (2019–2023)
- Kay Christofferson, District 53 (2023–present) and District 56 (2013–2023)
- Brady Brammer, District 54 (2023–present) and District 27 (2019–2023)
- Jon Hawkins, District 55 (2023–present) and District 57 (2019–2023)
- Jefferson Burton, District 64 (2023–present) and District 66 (2021–2023)
- Doug Welton, District 65 (2023–present) and District 67 (2021–2023)
- Christine Watkins, District 67 (2023–present) and District 69 (2009–2012 and 2017–2023)
- Walt Brooks, District 75 (2016–present)

County official

- Aimee Winder Newton, Salt Lake County Councilwoman from District 3 (2014–present)
Nikki Haley

U.S. Representatives

- Rob Bishop, UT-1 (2003-2021)

State executive officials

- Deidre Henderson, Lieutenant Governor of Utah (2021-present); Utah State Senator from District 7 (2013-2021)

State senators

- Evan Vickers, Majority Leader of the Utah Senate (2019-present) from the 28th district (2013-present) (switched support from Ron DeSantis)
- Mike McKell, District 25 (2023–present) and District 7 (2021–2023); Utah State Representative from District 25 (2013–2021) (switched support from Ron DeSantis)
- Ann Millner, District 5 (2023-present) and District 18 (2015-2023)

State representatives

- Casey Snider, District 5 (2019-present)

Notable Individuals

- Abby Cox, First Lady of Utah (2021-present)
Donald Trump

U.S. Senator

- Mike Lee, (2011-present)

U.S. Representative

- Burgess Owens, UT-04 (2021–present)

State Representative

- Phil Lyman, Member of the Utah House of Representatives from the 69th district (2023–present) and the 73rd district (2019–2023)

Local official

- Trent Staggs, Mayor of Riverton (2018–present); Riverton City Councilman from District 4 (2014–2018); Republican candidate for U.S. Senator from Utah in 2024 (previously endorsed Ron DeSantis)

== Maps ==
Endorsements by incumbent Republicans in the Utah State Senate. Endorsed Ron DeSantis (6) (withdrawn) Endorsed Donald Trump (6) Endorsed Nikki Haley (4) No endorsement (7)

== Results ==
Utah Republican caucus, March 5, 2024
Candidate	Votes	Percentage	Actual delegate count		
Candidate	Votes	Percentage	Bound	Unbound	Total
Donald Trump	48,350	56.35%	40		40
Nikki Haley	36,621	42.68%			
Ryan Binkley (withdrawn)	826	0.96%			
Total:	85,797	100.00%	40		40

2024 Utah Republican primary (results per county)
County	Donald Trump		Nikki Haley		Ryan Binkley		Total votes cast		
County	#	%	#	%	#	%	Total votes cast		
County	Beaver	199	87.28%	26	11.40%	3	Total votes cast	1.32%	228
Box Elder	1,503	62.70%	816	34.04%	78	3.26%	2,397		
Cache	2,129	52.44%	1,890	46.55%	41	1.01%	4,060		
Carbon	327	72.03%	124	27.31%	3	0.66%	454		
Daggett	55	84.62%	10	15.38%	0	0.00%	65		
Davis	6,026	48.42%	6,336	50.92%	82	0.66%	12,444		
Duchesne	476	81.65%	104	17.84%	3	0.51%	583		
Emery	297	82.04%	64	17.68%	1	0.28%	362		
Garfield	243	84.08%	46	15.92%	0	0.00%	289		
Grand	100	79.37%	26	20.63%	0	0.00%	126		
Iron	1,291	72.57%	473	26.59%	15	0.84%	1,779		
Juab	275	74.53%	93	25.20%	1	0.27%	369		
Kane	298	83.94%	55	15.49%	2	0.56%	355		
Millard	631	83.57%	121	16.03%	3	0.40%	755		
Morgan	291	62.05%	177	37.74%	1	0.21%	469		
Piute	82	92.13%	7	7.87%	0	0.00%	89		
Rich	103	73.57%	37	26.43%	0	0.00%	140		
Salt Lake	8,997	47.04%	9,864	51.57%	266	1.39%	19,127		
San Juan	272	77.06%	80	22.66%	1	0.28%	353		
Sanpete	611	77.64%	172	21.87%	4	0.51%	787		
Sevier	675	77.41%	188	21.56%	9	1.03%	872		
Summit	452	50.79%	436	48.99%	2	0.22%	890		
Tooele	923	65.46%	452	32.06%	35	2.48%	1,410		
Uintah	1,001	83.63%	195	16.29%	1	0.08%	1,197		
Utah	11,598	52.20%	10,404	46.82%	218	0.98%	22,220		
Wasatch	791	64.10%	427	34.60%	16	1.30%	1,234		
Washington	5,259	76.12%	1,640	23.74%	10	0.14%	6,909		
Wayne	129	83.77%	24	15.58%	1	0.65%	154		
Weber	3,208	61.85%	1,949	37.57%	30	0.58%	5,187		
Total	48,350	56.35%	36,621	42.68%	826	0.96%	85,797		

== Polling ==
Poll source	Date(s) administered	Sample size (Note: Key: A – all adults RV – registered voters LV – likely voters V – unclear)	Margin of error	Chris Christie	Ron DeSantis	Nikki Haley	Mike Pence	Vivek Ramaswamy	Tim Scott	Donald Trump	Other	Undecided
Dan Jones & Associates	Oct 12–23, 2023	509 (RV)	–	3%	14%	13%	5%	4%	1%	30%	–	20%
Dan Jones & Associates	Sep 24–29, 2023	802 (RV)	± 4.32%	4%	15%	11%	5%	5%	1%	33%	6%	22%
Dan Jones & Associates	Aug 7–14, 2023	476 (RV)	± 4.49%	4%	19%	4%	9%	5%	2%	27%	18% (Note: "Another candidate" with 11%; Liz Cheney with 5%; Asa Hutchinson with 2%)	13%
Noble Perspective Insights	Jul 7–18, 2023	301 (RV)	± 5.65%	2%	18%	3%	10%	6%	3%	48%	10% (Note: "None of these candidates" with 7%; "Someone else not listed" with 3%; Larry Elder and Francis Suarez with 0%)	–
Dan Jones & Associates	Jun 26 – Jul 4, 2023	495 (RV)	± 4.4%	4%	24%	3%	6%	2%	2%	29%	13% (Note: Liz Cheney with 4%; "Another candidate" with 9%)	16%
Dan Jones & Associates	May 22 – Jun 1, 2023	421 (RV)	± 4.8%	–	26%	5%	5%	4%	3%	27%	16% (Note: Liz Cheney with 7%; Ted Cruz with 3%; Asa Hutchinson with 1%; and "Another candidate" with 5%)	16%
Dan Jones & Associates	April 25–28, 2023	800 (RV)	± 3.5%	–	19%	8%	6%	–	–	21%	24% (Note: Liz Cheney with 11%; Ted Cruz with 4%; and "Another candidate" with 9%)	22%
WPA Intelligence (Note: Poll sponsored by Never Back Down PAC, which supports DeSantis)	April 18–20, 2023	504 (RV)	± 4.0%	–	46%	–	–	–	–	35%	–	19%
OH Predictive Insights	March 14–23, 2023	302 (RV)	± 5.6%	–	23%	5%	10%	–	0%	41%	5% (Note: Marco Rubio with 3%; Larry Hogan and Glenn Youngkin with 1%; Mike Pompeo, Chris Sununu and Asa Hutchinson with 0%)	–
Dan Jones & Associates	March 14–22, 2023	801 (RV)	± 3.5%	–	31%	5%	4%	–	–	23%	12% (Note: Liz Cheney with 9%; Ted Cruz with 3%)	–
OH Predictive Insights	Dec 27, 2022 – Jan 4, 2023	302 (RV)	± 5.6%	1%	29%	3%	11%	–	–	42%	12% (Note: Liz Cheney with 6%; Ted Cruz with 3%; Marco Rubio with 2%; Glenn Youngkin at 1%; Kristi Noem, Mike Pompeo and Kanye West at 0%)	2%
Dan Jones & Associates	Nov 18–23, 2022	802 (RV)	± 3.5%	–	24%	4%	6%	–	–	15%	30% (Note: Liz Cheney with 16%; Ted Cruz with 6%; Other with 8%)	21%
OH Predictive Insights	Nov 5–15, 2021	333 (RV)	± 5.4%	1%	7%	4%	9%	–	–	43%	25% (Note: Mitt Romney with 20%; Ted Cruz with 3%; Liz Cheney and Marco Rubio with 1%)	10%
OH Predictive Insights	Nov 5–15, 2021	333 (RV)	± 5.4%	1%	18%	5%	13%	–	–	–	32% (Note: Mitt Romney with 21%; Ted Cruz with 8%; Liz Cheney with 2%; Marco Rubio with 1%)	20%

== See also ==
- 2024 Republican Party presidential primaries
- 2024 United States presidential election
- 2024 United States presidential election in Utah
- 2024 United States elections

== Notes ==
Partisan clients
