= Rex Shipp =

American politician

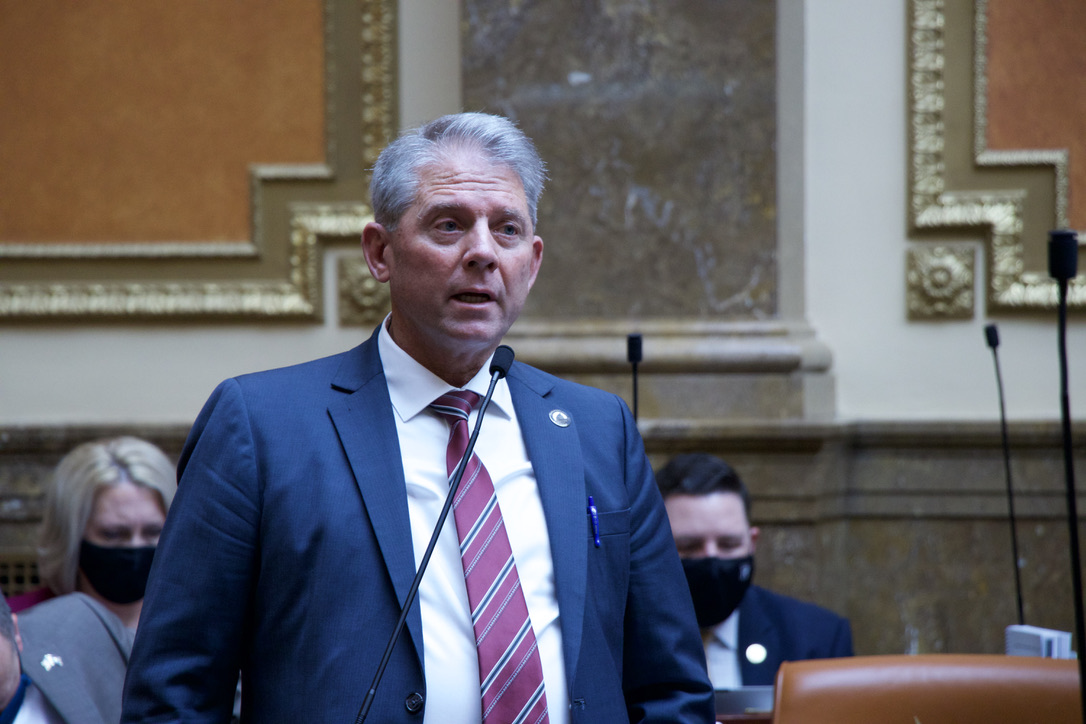
- Rex Shipp

Member of the Utah House of Representatives
- Incumbent
- Assumed office January 1, 2019
- Preceded by: John Westwood
- Constituency: 72nd district (2019–2023); 71st district (2023–present)

Personal details
- Party: Republican
- Spouse: Stacia
- Children: 7
- Education: Southern Utah University
- Website: electrexshipp.com

Rex Shipp is a Republican member of the Utah House of Representatives, representing District 71.

== Political career and positions ==
During the 2022 General Session, Shipp served on the Higher Education Appropriations Subcommittee, House Natural Resources, Agriculture, and Environment Committee, and House Public Utilities, Energy, and Technology Committee.

Although Shipp’s legislative district does not include Washington County, he voiced opposition to the changing of the name of Dixie State University to Utah Tech University. Shipp has advocated for gun-owners’ rights since he joined the Legislature in January 2019. Shipp has stated that he believes that the matter is not about gun control, but rather education; one of his bills, HB 258, would have created a three-year pilot program whereby students would be able to take a one-semester gun safety class by a qualified instructor and receive a semester hour of elective credit. The bill passed the Utah House by a vote of 47-21 but ultimately failed to pass the Senate.

== Electoral record ==
2020 general election: Utah House of Representatives, District 72
| Party | Candidate | Votes | % |
|---|---|---|---|
| Republican | Rex Shipp | 13,858 | 75.4% |
| Democratic | Lonnie White Jr. | 3,149 | 17.1% |
| Libertarian | Piper Manesse | 1,374 | 7.5% |

== 2022 sponsored legislation ==
| Bill | Status |
|---|---|
| HB 127- Medical Practice Amendments | House/ filed 3/4/22 |
| HB 158- Sale of Domesticated Animals Amendments | House/ filed 3/4/22 |
| HB 312- State Financial Contracts Amendments | House/ filed 3/4/22 |
| HB 449- Bereavement Leave Modifications | House/ to Governor 3/10/22 |
