= Ronald Winterton =

American politician

Member of the Utah Senate
- Incumbent
- Assumed office January 1, 2019
- Preceded by: Kevin T. VanTassell
- Constituency: 26th district (2019–2023); 20th district (2023–present)

Duchesne County Commissioner
- In office 2009–2019

Personal details
- Party: Republican
- Spouse: Lori Jo
- Children: 5

Ronald M. Winterton is a Republican member of the Utah Senate, representing the 20th District since 2023. Prior to redistricting he represented the 26th District starting in 2019.

== Political career ==
Winterton served as a Duchesne County Commissioner from 2009 to 2019.

In 2018, Winterton ran for election to the Utah State Senate, representing the 26th district, which covers Daggett, Duchesne, Summit, Uintah, and Wasatch counties. He won a three-way Republican primary with 43.1% of the vote, and won the general election with 62.7% of the vote.

Winterton currently sits on the following Senate committees:

- Health and Human Services (Chair)
- Transportation, Public Utilities, Energy, and Technology

== Electoral record ==
2022 general election: Utah State Senate election District 20
Party	Candidate	Votes	%
Republican	Ronald Winterton	27,781	68.7%
Democratic	Jill Fellow	12,664	31.3%
Total votes		40,445	100%

2018 general election: Utah State Senate election District 26
Party	Candidate	Votes	%
Republican	Ronald Winterton	24,727	62.7%
Democratic	Eileen Gallagher	13,758	34.9%
United Utah	Cathy Callow-Heusser	943	2.4%
Total votes		39,428	100%

2018 Republican primary: Utah State Senate election District 26
Party	Candidate	Votes	%
Republican	Ronald Winterton	6,824	43.1%
Republican	Brian Gorum	5,308	33.5%
Republican	Jack Rubin	3,706	23.4%
Total votes		15,838	100%
