= Utah's 28th State Senate district =

American legislative district

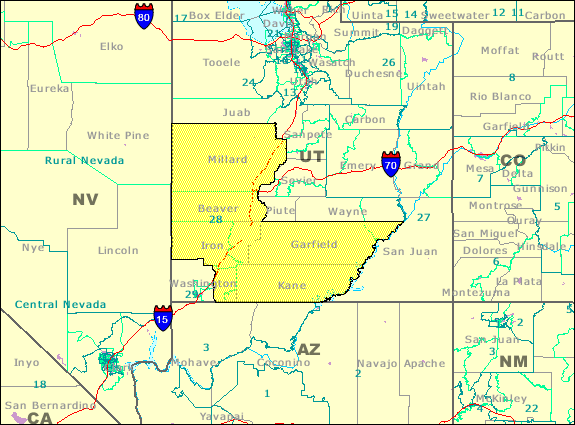
Map of the 28th Utah Senate District.

The 28th Utah Senate District is located in Beaver County, Utah, Garfield, Iron, Kane, Millard and Washington Counties and includes Utah House Districts 68, 69, 71, 72 and 73. The current State Senator representing the 28th district is Evan Vickers. Vickers was first elected to the Utah Senate in 2012 and has been reelected multiple times.

== Previous Utah State Senators (District 28) ==
Name	Party	Term
Casey O. Anderson	Republican	2011–2013
Evan Vickers	Republican	2013–present
Dennis E. Stowell	Republican	2006–2011
Thomas V. Hatch	Republican	2003–2006
Leonard M. Blackham	Republican	1993–2002
Cary Peterson	Republican	1981–1992
Thorpe A. Waddingham	Democratic	1977–1980
G. Stanford Rees	Republican	1973–1976
Kendrick Harward	Republican	1967–1972

== Election results ==
=== 2006 General Election ===
Utah State Senate election, 2006
Party	Candidate	Votes	%	±%
Republican	Dennis E. Stowell	14,868	64.4	
Democratic	Emily B. Hollinshead	6,660	28.9	
Constitution	Woodard H. Westfall	1,556	6.7	

== See also ==
- Dennis E. Stowell
- Utah Democratic Party
- Utah Republican Party
- Utah Senate
