= Casey Anderson =

Casey Anderson may refer to:

- Casey Anderson (musician) (1934–c. 1976), American blues and folk singer, songwriter and guitarist
- Casey Anderson (naturalist), American filmmaker, wildlife naturalist, and television presenter
- Casey O. Anderson, member of the Utah Senate
