= Phil Uipi =

Tongan-American lawyer, real estate broker, and politician

Member of the Utah House of Representatives
- In office 1992–1994

Personal details
- Party: Republican
- Relations: Doug Fiefia (nephew)

Filia "Phil" Uipi is a Tongan-American lawyer, real estate broker, and politician in Millcreek, Utah. He was the first Pacific Islander to be elected to the Utah State Legislature and remains the only Tongan-born person to have been elected. As of 2010, he remained the only Tongan elected to statewide office in the country.

== Early life ==
The youngest of eight children, Uipi was born in 1949 in Fotuha'a, Tonga, and grew up in Fakakakai, on the island of Ha'apai.

== Education ==
Uipi attended Liahona High School, where he was elected student body president and was also valedictorian of his graduating class. These achievements earned him a scholarship to Brigham Young University–Hawaii. For his final year of college he transferred to Brigham Young University's main campus in Provo, Utah. He graduated with a degree in zoology. Uipi matriculated at the University of Utah's S.J. Quinney College of Law in 1982 and graduated with a J.D. degree in 1986.

== Career ==
Prior to attending law school, Uipi started his career selling real estate. In part, he held this job while his wife went to college to get a degree in accounting. Four years after she graduated he then went to law school. When he was admitted to the Utah Bar in 1986 he became the first Tongan attorney in the state. Uipi continued his real estate work with a focus on investment, purchasing and managing a number of properties. Since a good deal of the legal work he did was pro bono, Uipi reported that his real estate career funded his legal career.

He served as a Republican in the state legislature from 1991 to 1994, during which he was chair of the Judiciary Committee.

In 1992, Uipi returned to Tonga to attend the National Conference on the Tongan Constitution and Democracy, chaired by pro-democracy movement leader Father Selwyn 'Akau'ola. Police met him at the airport, however, and placed Uipi and his wife back on the plane on which they had arrived and returned them to the US.

In 2014 the U.S. Commission on Civil Rights appointed Uipi to the Utah State Advisory Committee.

== Personal life ==
His nephew Doug Fiefia was elected to the Utah House of Representatives in 2024.
