= Senator Anderson =

Senator Anderson may refer to:

== Members of the Northern Irish Senate ==
- Albert Anderson (politician) (1907–1986), Northern Irish Senator from 1963 to 1968

== Members of the United States Senate ==
- Alexander O. Anderson (1794–1869), U.S. Senator from Tennessee from 1840 to 1841, later served in the California State Senate
- Clinton Anderson (New Mexico politician) (1895–1975), U.S. Senator from New Mexico from 1949 to 1973
- Joseph Anderson (1757–1837), U.S. Senator from Tennessee from 1797 to 1815
- Wendell R. Anderson (1933–2016), U.S. Senator from Minnesota from 1976 to 1978, also in the Minnesota State Senate

== United States state senate members ==
=== Arizona State Senate ===
- Mark Anderson (Arizona politician) (born 1957)

=== California State Senate ===
- Joel Anderson (born 1960)

=== Connecticut State Senate ===
- Robert P. Anderson (1906–1978)

=== Florida State Senate ===
- Dick Anderson (born 1946)

=== Georgia ===
- Lee Anderson (American politician) (born 1957)
- Tonya Anderson (born 1969)

=== Hawaii State Senate ===
- D. G. Anderson (born 1930)
- Whitney Anderson (born 1931)

=== Illinois State Senate ===
- Neil Anderson (Illinois politician) (born 1982)

=== Iowa State Senate ===
- Bill Anderson (Iowa politician) (born 1977)
- Quentin V. Anderson (1932–2019)

=== Kansas State Senate ===
- John Anderson Jr. (1917–2014)

=== Michigan State Senate ===
- Glenn S. Anderson (born 1954)

=== Minnesota State Senate ===
- Bruce Anderson (politician) (born 1950)
- Ellen Anderson (born 1959)
- Jerald C. Anderson (1934–2014)
- Paul Anderson (Minnesota state senator) (born 1973)

=== Mississippi State Senate ===
- Doug Anderson (politician) (1939–2013)

=== Montana State Senate ===
- LeRoy H. Anderson (1906–1991)

=== Nebraska State Senate ===
- Gary Anderson (sport shooter) (born 1939)
- Lester Anderson (1894–1979)
- Victor Anderson (Nebraska politician) (1902–1962)

=== New York State Senate ===
- Floyd E. Anderson (1891–1976)
- Warren M. Anderson (1915–2007)

=== North Dakota State Senate ===
- Howard C. Anderson Jr.

=== Ohio State Senate ===
- Charles Anderson (governor) (1814–1895)

=== Oklahoma State Senate ===
- Patrick Anderson (Oklahoma politician) (born 1967)

=== Oregon State Senate ===
- Dick Anderson (Oregon politician) (born 1950)
- Laurie Monnes Anderson (born 1945)

=== South Carolina State Senate ===
- Ralph Anderson (politician) (1927–2019)

=== Tennessee State Senate ===
- Josiah M. Anderson (1807–1861)

=== Utah State Senate ===
- Casey O. Anderson (fl. 2010s)

=== Virginia State Senate ===
- Howard P. Anderson (1915–2000)
- John T. Anderson (1804–1879)

=== Washington State Senate ===
- Cal Anderson (1948–1995)

=== Wisconsin State Senate ===
- John Anderson (Wisconsin senator) (1870–1954)
- Matthew Anderson (politician) (1822–1910)

=== Wyoming State Senate ===
- James Lee Anderson (born 1948)
- Jim Anderson (American politician) (born 1943)

== Canadian Senators ==
- Margaret Dawn Anderson (born 1967), Canadian Senator for the Northwest Territories

== See also ==
- Elmer L. Andersen (1909–2004), Minnesota State Senate
- James A. Andersen (1924–2022), Washington State Senate
