= Christina Hernandez =

American politician

Member-elect of the Utah Senate from the 5th district
- Assuming office January 1, 2027
- Succeeding: Jill Koford

Personal details
- Party: Democratic
- Education: Weber State University; Utah State University
- Website: Campaign website

Christina (CJ) Hernandez is an American politician. A member of the Democratic Party, she is the member-elect for the 5th district of the Utah State Senate. She was elected at the 2026 election. She unseated Republican Jill Koford.
