= Shana Anderson =

American politician

Member-elect of the Utah Senate from the 19th district
- Assuming office January 2027
- Succeeding: Kirk Cullimore Jr.

Personal details
- Party: Democratic
- Education: Utah State University

Military service
- Branch/service: U.S. Army; Utah National Guard

Shana Anderson Stewart is an American politician and member-elect of the Utah State Senate. A member of the Democratic Party, Anderson defeated Republican incumbent and majority leader Kirk Cullimore Jr. in 2026.

== Background ==
Anderson is originally from Idaho and moved to Utah around 2016. She served in the U.S. Army for five years in active duty as well as two years in the Utah National Guard. She then earned a Master's degree in applied economics from Utah State University. Anderson resides in Sandy, Utah, with her husband and children.

== Utah State Senate ==
Anderson challenged Republican incumbent Kirk Cullimore Jr. in 2026 primarily due to national politics and disagreement over his support of a bill banning collective bargaining for public sector employees and the state's school voucher program. Cullimore, as the body's majority leader, was seen as the likely successor of president Stuart Adams. Despite raising around $1,300 to Cullimore's more than $200,000, Anderson defeated him in the general election.
