= Andreas Kipar =

German architect (born 1960)

- Born: 19 May 1960 (age 66); Gelsenkirchen, West Germany
- Education: University of Duisburg-Essen
- Occupation: Architect

Andreas Kipar (born 19 May 1960, in Gelsenkirchen) is a German landscape architect, architect, urban planner and lecturer in landscape architecture based in Milan.

== Biography ==
Following a gardener's apprenticeship from 1980 to 1984, Kipar obtained a degree in landscape architecture at the University of GHS Essen (now the University of Duisburg-Essen). From 1989 to 1994, he studied architecture and urban planning at the Milan Polytechnic (TU Milan).

In 1990, he founded the international landscape architecture, planning, and consultancy office LAND in Milan, together with the agronomist Giovanni Sala. Under Kipar’s direction, LAND (acronym of "Landscape Architecture Nature Development") manages worldwide projects from Italy with branches in Germany, Switzerland, Austria, Canada and the Middle East.

Furthermore, Kipar is co-founder and president of Green City Italia, a non-profit association for the promotion of values connected to urban greenery.

From 1998 to 2009 Kipar taught landscape architecture at the University of Genoa. Since 2009, he has been teaching Public Space Design at the Milan Polytechnic. Guest lectures have taken him to universities and colleges and international conferences in several European countries.

Kipar has also been working as a consultant in various expert groups and scientific committees since 1985. In 2021 he joined the Italian association for natural resources and renewable energies Assorisorse as a general counsellor. Since 2023 he is a consulting associate for the Edison SpA initiative “Rigeneriamo il Territorio". In November 2023 he was appointed by the World Economic Forum as a member of the global Expert Taskforce for Nature-Positive Cities.

Kipar is married to an Italian (2 children).

== Awards (selection) ==
- International ELCA Trend Award "Building with Green" of the European Landscape Contractors Association 2002;
- German-Italian business award (special award) 2018;
- MIPIM Award 2018;
- CSLA (Canadian Society of Landscape Architects) 2021 Awards of Excellence;
- European Garden Award 2023;
- Halstenberg-Prize 2024;
- City’Scape Award 2025 (Paysage/Topscape, 1st Prize, Category D);
- Global Award for Sustainable Architecture 2026.

In addition, in 2007 Kipar was awarded the Order of Merit of the Federal Republic of Germany.

== Projects (selection) ==
- Northpark (Parco Nord), Milan 1985 - 2000
- Portello Park (Ex Alfa Romeo), Milan 1997 - 2023
- Master Plan Green Rays, Milan 2005 - ongoing
- Krupp Park "Five Hills", Essen 2006 -2011
- Masterplan Venice Green Tree, Porto Marghera 2014 -2015
- Landscaping Expo Dubai 2020, Dubai 2015
- Airolo Valley Renaturation, Canton Ticino 2017
- MIND Milan Innovation District, Milan 2017 - ongoing
- Corridor de Biodiversité de Saint-Laurent, Montreal 2018 – 2019
- Schwarz Campus Project, Bad Friedrichshall 2018 – ongoing
- LOC Loreto Open Community, Milan 2021 – ongoing
- Park Unione Ex Falck Areas, Sesto San Giovanni 2021 – ongoing
- Al-Urubah Park, Riyadh 2020
- Masterplan Vercelli 2021 - ongoing
- Expo 2030 Riyadh Concept Masterplan, Riyadh 2024 - ongoing

(A detailed list can be found on the website of LAND srl).

== Publications (selected) ==
Andreas Kipar has written numerous articles for German, Italian and English magazines, newspapers, and books. Among them:

- Emscher Park, Ruhr basin. A project of environmental restructuring for the international expo (IBA), Il Pomerio, Lodi 1993;
- Il giardino paesaggistico tra 700 e 800 in Italia e in Germania (together with Pier Fausto Bagatti Valsecchi), Guerini e Associati, Milan 1996;
- Architetture del Paesaggio - Ideas and competitions - L’Architettura del Paesaggio attraverso un racconto di concorsi, idee e progetti, Il Verde Editoriale, Milan 2003;
- Das Himmelskreuz im Luthergarten Wittenberg (with Thomas Schönauer), Engelage & Lieder, 2018, ISBN 978-3-00-060991-6;
- Kipar A., Aufbruch in eine neue Zeit. Die produktiven Landschaften und ihre Rolle in der Spätmoderne, in: Vigoni Papers no. 4/2022, curated by C. Liermann Traniello, M. Scotto, F. Zilio, Villa Vigoni Editore, 2022;
- Kipar A., Pagliaro V., „Landscape of Relations“, in: Representing Landscapes – Visualizing Climate Action, ed. by Nadia Amoroso Routledge, 2025, ISBN 978-1-032-51996-8;
- Kipar A., several contributions, in: ESSEN | RUHRMETROPOLE – Stadtentwicklung 21+, Stadt Essen, ed. Harter, Nellen, Paetzel, Verlag Kettler, Essen, 2024;
- Kipar A., Diversity, Nature and Hope, in: STRESSTEST, German contribution for the 19th Venice Architecture Biennale 2025, ed. by Nicola Borgmann, Elisabeth Endres, Gabriele G. Kiefer, Daniele Santucci / Architekturgalerie München e.V., Distanz, München, 2025; ISBN 978-3-95476-740-3;
- Kipar, A.O., Galiulo, V., Signorini, G., Galimberti, D. (2026). Nature-Positive: Transforming Cities and Landscapes with Scalable Strategies and Projects. Insights from LAND’s Case Studies, in: De Toni, A., Arcidiacono, A., Ronchi, S. (eds) Nature-Positive Cities: Adaptive Spatial Planning in Italy for an Ecological Urban Transition. SpringerBriefs in Applied Sciences and Technology(). Springer, Cham; ISBN 978-3-032-06617-6;
- Kipar, A., Preface, in: Paesaggi-Percorsi. Ricucire infrastrutture e territori, ed. by: Catherine Dezio, Giovanni Giacomello, Anna Lei, Mario Paris, letteraventidue, 2025; ISBN 979-12-5644-143-3;
- Kipar, A., Die Stadt lebt auf, ed. by Henning Klüver, 2025.

Between 2022 and 2024, Andreas Kipar has published three editions of his company’s internal magazine LAND Magazine in collaboration with Andrea Küpfer and Henning Klüver. The magazines include articles and interviews by experts reflecting on nature, cities, and future ways of living. They can be found on the website of Land srl.

Also published about him by Alessandra Coppa and Giuseppe Marioni: Andreas Kipar Una monografia, Milan 2015.

== Individual mentions ==
1. Land Team Germany. Portal Landscape Architecture today (Association of German Landscape Artists). Downloaded on 3 November 2018

2. Du must mal raus/You have to get out post blog Cluverius 8. July 2018. Downloaded on 5. November 2018

3. Curriculum Vitae 2016 Milan Polytechnic. Downloaded 3 November 2018

4. Henning Klüver: Der Vordenker/The Forward Thinker In: Süddeutsche Zeitung, 3 July 2018. Downloaded 3 November 2018

5. Report of the NRW Architecture Chamber (6. March 2007). [1] Downloaded on 7. November 2018

6. Regione Sardegna, Assessorato Urbanistica, Determinazione 2820 / DG (22. December 2009). Downloaded on 2 November 2018

7. Mercurio eV Press release (6. July 2018). Downloaded on 3. November 2018

8. MIPIM Awards 2018 (15. March 2018. Downloaded on 4. November 2018

9. SMOwn Publishing Scientific book publisher since 2011. Downloaded on 3. November 2018
