= Carl Wimmer =

American politician (born 1975)

Carl Daniel Wimmer

Member of the Utah House of Representatives from the 52nd district
- In office January 3, 2007 – January 4, 2012
- Preceded by: Dave Hogue
- Succeeded by: Daniel McCay

Personal details
- Born: June 30, 1975 (age 51) Salt Lake, Utah
- Party: Republican
- Spouse: Sherry
- Children: 5 (2 foster children and 3 biological)
- Profession: Police officer, small business owner, pastor

Carl Daniel Wimmer (born June 30, 1975) is a Utah politician who served as a member of the Utah House of Representatives from 2007-2012 before resigning to run for the United States House of Representatives.

== Early life, education, and law enforcement career ==
Wimmer was born in 1975 in Salt Lake, Utah. He was raised in West Valley, Utah. He attended Utah Peace Officer Standards and Training and Salt Lake Community College, and has a M.S in religious and theological studies, having graduated summa cum laude from Liberty University.

He began his career in law enforcement in 1997, at the Granite School Police department then later transferred to South Jordan police and eventually West Valley City Police Department. Later working and retiring from police work in Gunnison City Utah. He is a member of the American Center for Law and Justice and a lifetime member of the National Rifle Association of America (NRA). He was awarded a Police Star in 2006, South Jordan Officer of the Year in 2001, and the Outstanding Service Award in 2004. Wimmer owns a small landscaping company.

Wimmer has won WABDL World Power Lifting titles in the Law/Fire Class.

== Utah House of Representatives ==
=== Elections ===
In 2006, he ran for Utah's Herriman-based 52nd House District, vacated by incumbent Republican State Representative Dave Hogue, who ran for the Utah Senate. He won the primary with 57% of the vote, and the general election with 66% of the vote. He won re-election in 2008 with 65% and in 2010 with 79%.

=== Tenure ===
In the state legislature, Wimmer introduced the Sudden Cardiac Arrest Survival Act, which was signed into law in 2009. The bill disbanded the statewide automatic external defibrillator (AED) database, replacing it with systems operated by local emergency medical dispatch centers, and amended civil liability immunity provisions pertaining to AEDs.

In 2010, Wimmer introduced legislation prohibiting a state agency or department from implementing federal health care reform passed by Congress after March 1, 2010, without the state legislature's authorization.

He was the first legislator in the nation to introduce a state constitutional amendment mandating that union organizing be done by secret ballot, as a direct response to federal card check legislation.

He got an A+ from the NRA and lead the movement to defeat the ban on legally concealed weapons at the University of Utah. He also sponsored legislation to increase penalties for Utahns convicted of drive-by shootings by requiring that such crimes be prosecuted as aggravated assault and allowing prosecutors to simultaneously pursue felony charges of illegally discharging a firearm.

Wimmer lead the fight in Utah against abortion, introducing several bills relating to abortion, including legislation protecting doctors and hospitals who refuse to perform abortion on religious grounds, blocking a provision in the Patient Protection and Affordable Care Act would allow state health insurance exchanges to provide coverage for abortions, and requiring clinics that provide abortion services to apply for a license and be subject to a biannual inspection.

Wimmer supports repealing the Sixteenth Amendment.

=== Committee assignments ===
- Government Operations and Political Subdivisions Interim Committee
- House Law Enforcement and Criminal Justice Committee
- House Revenue and Taxation Committee
- House Rules Committee
- Revenue and Taxation Interim Committee
  - Infrastructure and General Government Appropriations Subcommittee

== Other political activities ==
He is a co-founder of the state sovereignty group, The Patrick Henry Caucus, a nationwide coalition of legislators and grassroots activists who are committed to restoring the balance of power between states and the federal government. He is a national board member of Pass the Balanced Budget Amendment. He is also the chairman of the Utah Family Action Council.

== 2012 congressional election ==
Wimmer resigned from his Utah house seat in January 2012 to run for the newly created Utah's 4th congressional district. He lost at the Republican state convention to Mia Love. Mia Love lost to incumbent, Jim Matheson.

== Pastorship ==
In 2015 Wimmer and his wife started a small bible study in their home with only a few initial attendants. Within a year, their living room was filled with many people and they moved to a larger home to accommodate the growing number of attendants. In 2017, Wimmer felt called to start a church in his home. With the support of many others from sister churches, they began services where upwards of sixty can attend. In early 2021 he was called to work as the pastor for First Baptist Church of Duchesne. Carl has been working there ever since.

== Personal life ==
Wimmer is a devout Christian and a former Mormon. He married his wife, Sherry, in 1998; they have three children as well as two foster children who both have severe disabilities. They reside in Duchesne, Utah.
