= Pukotala =

Coordinates: 19.679°S 174.281°W

Pukotala is a settlement in Ha'ano island, Tonga. It has a population of 89.
