= Leah Hansen =

American politician

Member of the Utah House of Representatives from the 51st district
- Incumbent
- Assumed office August 13, 2025
- Preceded by: Jefferson Moss

Personal details
- Born: Hawaii, U.S.
- Party: Republican
- Education: Weber State University (no degree)

Leah Tonga Hansen is an American politician serving as a member of the Utah House of Representatives from the 51st district. A Republican, she was appointed to the seat in 2025.

== Background ==
Hansen was born in Hawaii to Brigham Young University-Hawaii students from Tonga and New Zealand; she lived in Tonga until she was 12 years old when the family moved to Utah. She is of Pacific Islander descent. She attended Weber State University before prioritizing family to raise her children.

A stay-at-home mom, Hansen began attending committee and floor meetings of the Utah State Legislature around 2016. She supported HB261, an anti-DEI bill sponsored by Katy Hall, in January 2024. In January 2025 she testified in support of state senator Lincoln Fillmore's bill encouraging childhood independence and free play.

== Utah House of Representatives ==
In May 2025, Hansen announced her campaign to be appointed to Jefferson Moss' seat in the Utah House of Representatives following his resignation to lead Governor Spencer Cox's Office of Economic Opportunity. Hansen won the special election to fill the seat, winning 59.52% of Utah County Republican Party delegates in the third round. She has introduced no bills, saying “I don’t have any bills at this time because I believe that restraint begins with me. If I’m wanting to limit government, I’d better start by limiting myself” in January 2026.

== Electoral history ==
2025 Utah House District 51 special election results
| Candidate | First round | | Second round | | Third round | |
| Candidate | Votes | % | Votes | % | Votes | % |
|---|---|---|---|---|---|---|
| Leah Hansen | 33 | 39.29% | 45 | 53.57% | 50 | 59.52% |
| Corey Astill | 35 | 41.67% | 35 | 39.29% | 34 | 40.48% |
| Melissa Gonzalez | 10 | 11.9% | 4 | 4.76% | Eliminated | |
| Jason Putnam | 4 | 4.76% | Eliminated | | | |
| Ricardo Felix | 1 | 1.2% | Eliminated | | | |
| Total | 83 | 100.0% | 84 | 100.0% | 84 | 100.0% |
