= Jay Cobb =

American politician

Member of the Utah House of Representatives from the 48th district
- In office January 1, 2023 – January 1, 2025
- Preceded by: Keven Stratton
- Succeeded by: Doug Fiefia

Personal details
- Party: Republican
- Education: Brigham Young University; George Washington University Law School
- Website: web.archive.org/web/2/http://jaycobbforcongress.com

James (Jay) F. Cobb is an American politician. He served as a Republican member for the 48th district in the Utah House of Representatives from 2023 to 2025.

== Electoral Record ==
2022 Utah House of Representatives election, District 48
Party	Candidate	Votes	%
Republican	Jay Cobb	8,309	60
Democratic	Katie Olson	5,541	40
Total votes		13,850	100
