= Haʻano =

Island in Tonga

Coordinates: 19.674°S 174.278°W

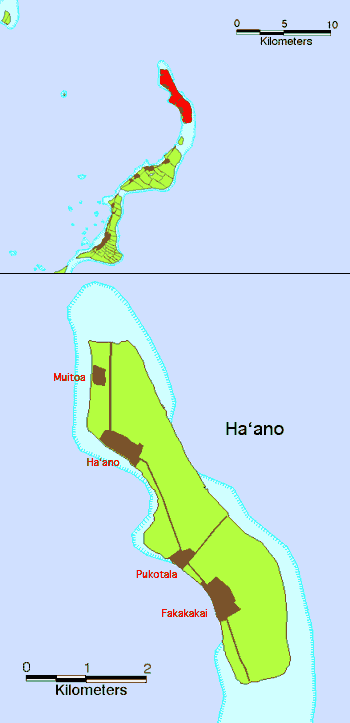
Haʻano

Haʻano is an island in the Haʻapai islands of Tonga. To the south are the islands of Foa and Lifuka.

The island is 6.58 km^{2} (2.54 sq mi) in area. It is losing population, which dropped from 588 in 1996 to 477 in 2006.

The island's four villages are located on the west coast. From north to south, they are Muitoa, Ha'ano town, Pukotala and Fakakakai.

Ha'ano is the main village and district center, with a population of 123. Fakakakai is the largest village, with a population of 150.

The district includes the namesake island as well as the island Mo'unga'one (1.17 km^{2}, pop. 63, 20 km to the west) and a few uninhabited islands.

Tonga's 15th Prime Minister, 'Akilisi Pohiva, was born in Fakakakai, Ha'ano in 1941. Several church leaders are from Ha'ano, including Rev. Finau Katoanga and Rev. Dr. Tuipulotu Katoanga.

== Trivia ==
In 2004 a German television station sponsored two German families to live for three months on the island 'like natives'. The result of this experiment was filmed.
