= Doug Fiefia =

American politician

Member of the Utah House of Representatives from the 48th district
- Incumbent
- Assumed office January 1, 2025
- Preceded by: Jay Cobb
- Succeeded by: Jake Hunsaker (elect)

Personal details
- Party: Republican
- Relations: Phil Uipi (uncle)
- Education: Utah State University; Rice University
- Website: dougfiefia.com

Doug K. Fiefia is an American politician serving as a Republican member for the 48th district in the Utah House of Representatives since 2025.

== Early life and education ==
Fiefia's parents immigrated to Utah from Tonga in the 1970s. His uncle, Phil Uipi, served in the Utah House of Representatives from 1991 to 1994.

Fiefia graduated from Bingham High School, where he played football and served as student body president.

== Career ==
Fiefia previously worked in technology sales at Google.

=== Utah House of Representatives ===
In 2024, Fiefia was elected to the Utah House of Representatives representing the 48th district. His experience working at Google pushed him to become a proponent of data privacy laws and AI regulation.

=== Utah State Senate ===
In 2026, Fiefia became the first Tongan American elected to a state senate in the United States after winning a seat in the Utah State Senate. Fiefia labeled the results for his party nationally as a "bloodbath," even while he was considered a shoe-in for his own race.

== Electoral Record ==
2024 Utah House of Representatives election, District 48
Party	Candidate	Votes	%
Republican	Doug Fiefia	13,054	63.8
Democratic	Stephen Middleton	7,405	36.2
Total votes		20,459	100
