= European Landscape Contractors Association =

- Abbreviation: ELCA
- Formation: 1963
- Purpose: Committed to encourage the cooperation and exchange of information as well as experience
- Headquarters: Bad Honnef, Germany
- Members: 21 national landscaping associations
- President: Emmanuel Mony
- Website: www.elca.info

The European Landscape Contractors Association (ELCA) is the European trade association of garden- and landscape-contractors based in Bad Honnef, Germany. The ELCA was founded in 1963 in order to promote cooperation as well as the exchange of information and experience in Europe.

== Purpose ==
The main goals of the ELCA are the following:

- Promote the mutual exchange of information and experience
- Look after the interests of landscape contractors Europe-wide
- Promote cooperation with organizations with similar goals Europe-wide
- Support the vocational training of young people and the mutual exchange of young qualified landscape gardeners

== Members ==
21 national landscaping associations are currently full members of the ELCA:

- Belgium: Belgische Federatie Groenvoorzieners / Fédération Belge Entrepreneurs (BFG / FBEP)
- Denmark: Danske Anlægsgartnere (DAG)
- Germany: Bundesverband Garten-, Landschafts- und Sportplatzbau e.V. (BGL)
- Finland: Viheraluerakentajat r.y.
- France: Union Nationale des Entrepreneurs du Paysage (UNEP)
- Greece: Greek National Union of Agriculturist Landscape Contractors (PEEGEP)
- Great Britain: The British Association of Landscape Industries (BALI)
- Ireland: Association of Landscape Contractors of Ireland (ALCI)
- Italy: Associazione Italiana Costruttori Del Verde (ASSOVERDE)
- Luxembourg: Fédération Horticole Luxembourgeoise (A.S.B.L.)
- Malta: Environmental Landscapes Consortium Limited
- Netherlands: Vereniging van Hoveniers en Groenvoorzieners (VHG)
- Norway: Norsk Anleggsgartnermesterlag (NAML)
- Austria: Bundesinnung der Gärtner und Floristen
- Poland: Stowarzyszenie Architektury Krajobrazu (Zieleń Polska)
- Russia: Guild of Professionals in Landscape Industry (GPLI)
- Sweden: Sveriges Trädgardanläggningsförbund (STAF)
- Switzerland: JardinSuisse
- Spain: Federación Española de Empresas de Jardinería (FEEJ)
- Czech Republic: Svaz zakládání a údržby zeleně (SZÚZ)
- Hungary: Magyar Kertépítö és Fenntartó Vállalkozók Országos Szövetsége (MAKEOSZ)

Additionally, the ELCA has five associated members:

- China: Landscape Architecture Corporation of China
- EAC: European Arboricultural Council
- Japan: Japan Federation of Landscape Contractors
- Canada: Canadian Nursery Landscape Association / Association Canadienne des Pépiniéristes
- United States of America: American Nursery & Landscape Association (ANLA)

== See also ==
- European Garden Heritage Network
- Garden Society of Gothenburg
