= Todd Kiser =

American politician

Member of the Utah House of Representatives from the 41st district
- In office January 1, 2003 – December 31, 2012
- Preceded by: Patrice Arent
- Succeeded by: Daniel McCay

Personal details
- Born: July 28, 1951 (age 74)
- Party: Republican

Todd Kiser (born July 28, 1951) is an American politician who served in the Utah House of Representatives from the 41st district from 2003 to 2012.
