= Jake Hunsaker =

American politician

Member-elect of the Utah House of Representatives from the 48th district
- Assuming office January 2027
- Succeeding: Doug Fiefia

Personal details
- Party: Republican

Jake Hunsaker is an American politician. A member of the Republican Party, he is the member-elect for the 48th district of the Utah House of Representatives.
