= Jackie Larson =

American politician

Member of the Utah House of Representatives from the 64th district
- Incumbent
- Assumed office May 5, 2026
- Preceded by: Jeff Burton

Personal details
- Children: 2

Jackie Larson is an American politician serving as a member of the Utah House of Representatives representing the 64th district. She was appointed in May 2026 to succeed Jeff Burton, who resigned after moving out of the district.

== Career ==
Larson is the owner and manager of Seven Bar Farming, which led her to oppose an inland port industrial project in Spanish Fork in July 2023. She has worked in healthcare revenue cycle management for 14 years. In October 2025, Larson graduated from the American Farm Bureau Federation’s Women’s Communications Boot Camp for women leaders in the agriculture industry.

In April 2026, Larson won the Utah Republican Party convention vote to replace Jeff Burton, who resigned after moving out of the district. She had previously announced a primary campaign challenge against him. She was sworn in on May 5, 2026.

== Personal life ==
Larson is a mother of two and resides in Spanish Fork, Utah, with her husband.
