= Muitoa =

Coordinates: 19.652°S 174.294°W

Muitoa is a settlement in Ha'ano island, Tonga. It had a population of 53 in 2016.
