= Utah's 21st State Senate district =

American legislative district

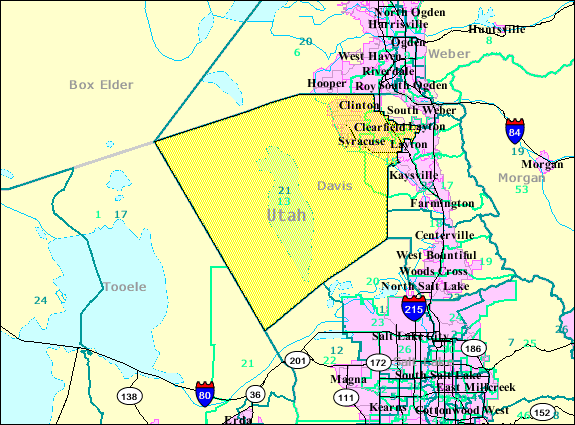
Map of the 21st Utah Senate District before January 1st, 2023.

Utah's 21st State Senate district is located in Davis County and includes Utah House Districts 11, 13, 14, 15 and 16. The current State Senator representing the 21st district is Jerry Stevenson. Stevenson was elected by delegates to replace Sheldon Killpack after Killpack's resignation in January 2010. Stevenson is up for re-election in November 2022 after winning the 2018 Election.

== Previous Utah State Senators (District 21) ==
Name	Party	Term
Jerry W. Stevenson	Republican	2010–2022
Sheldon Killpack	Republican	2003–2010
David H. Steele	Republican	1987–2003
Dona M. Wayment	Republican	1982–1986
Sherman A. Wayment	Republican	1979–1981
Warner, Keith C.	Democratic	1975–1978
Sherman A. Wayment	Republican	1973–1974
Reed Bullen	Republican	1967–1972

== =2022 General Election ==
Utah State Senate election, 2022
Party	Candidate	Votes	%	±%
Republican	Mike Kennedy	34,671	100.0	+28.3

=== 2018 General Election ===
Utah State Senate election, 2018
Party	Candidate	Votes	%	±%
Republican	Jerry Stevenson	23,889	71.7	−6.6
Democratic	Jake Penrod	9,435	28.3	+6.6

=== 2014 General Election ===
Utah State Senate election, 2014
Party	Candidate	Votes	%	±%
Republican	Jerry Stevenson	11,950	78.3	+6.9
Democratic	Sherri Tatton	3,309	21.7	−2.9

=== 2010 General Election ===
Utah State Senate election, 2010
Party	Candidate	Votes	%	±%
Republican	Jerry Stevenson	12,649	71.4	+0.1
Democratic	Sarah Schofield	4,359	24.6	+0.6
Libertarian	Vincent Marcus	704	4	−0.5

=== 2004 General Election ===
Utah State Senate election, 2004
Party	Candidate	Votes	%	±%
Republican	Sheldon L. Killpack	19,981	71.5	?
Democratic	Kyle M. Crosland	6,693	24.0	?
Libertarian	Brent Zimmerman	1,260	4.5	?

== See also ==
- Utah Democratic Party
- Utah Republican Party
- Libertarian Party of Utah
- Utah Senate
