= Casey Snider =

American politician

Majority Leader of the Utah House of Representatives
- Incumbent
- Assumed office June 3, 2025
- Preceded by: Jefferson Moss

Member of the Utah House of Representatives from the 5th district
- Incumbent
- Assumed office October 17, 2018
- Preceded by: R. Curt Webb

Personal details
- Born: November 26, 1985 (age 40) Liberty, Utah, U.S.
- Party: Republican
- Spouse: Kelli
- Children: 1
- Education: Utah State University (BS); Johns Hopkins University (MS)

Casey Snider (born November 26, 1985) is an American politician serving as a member of the Utah House of Representatives from the 5th district. He assumed office on October 17, 2018.

== Early life and education ==
Snider was raised in Liberty, Utah. He earned a Bachelor of Science degree in conservation and restoration ecology, law, and constitutional studies from Utah State University and a Master of Science in environmental science and policy from Johns Hopkins University.

== Career ==
After earning his master's degree, Snider worked in the field of environmental and natural resources policy, commuting between Utah and Washington, D.C. He worked as a legislative director for Rob Bishop and was a staffer on the United States House Committee on Natural Resources. He is the executive director of the Bear River Land Conservancy. Snider has also worked as a rancher and volunteer firefighter in Cache County, Utah.

Snider was appointed to the Utah House of Representatives in December 2018. Upon assuming office, he became one of the youngest members of the House. He was subsequently elected to the seat in November 2018.

Snider was elected as majority leader in June 2025.

== Personal life ==
Snider and his wife, Kelli, have one daughter. They live in Avon, Utah.

Utah House of Representatives
Preceded by Jefferson Moss	Majority Leader of the Utah House of Representatives; 2025–present	Incumbent
