= Mike McKell =

American lawyer and politician

Member of the Utah Senate
- Incumbent
- Assumed office January 1, 2021
- Preceded by: Deidre Henderson
- Constituency: 7th district (2021–2023); 25th district (2023–present)

Member of the Utah House of Representatives from the 66th District
- In office January 1, 2013 – January 1, 2021
- Preceded by: Michael Morley
- Succeeded by: Jeff Burton

Personal details
- Party: Republican
- Spouse: Brandi Cox

Mike K. McKell is an American lawyer and politician from the state of Utah. A member of the Republican Party, McKell is a member of the Utah State Senate serving the 25th district. Prior to redistricting, he represented the 7th District. In November 2024, McKell was elected as the Majority Assistant Whip. He also previously served in the Utah House of Representatives, in the 66th district from 2013 to 2021. Spencer Cox, the Governor of Utah, is McKell's brother-in-law.

== Early life and career ==
Mike McKell grew up in Ferron, Utah. He earned a B.A. from Southern Utah University and a J.D. from the University of Idaho. McKell is the founding partner of Utah Legal Team. Martindale-Hubbell has confirmed that attorney Mike McKell maintains the AV Preeminent Rating, Martindale-Hubbell's highest possible rating for both ethical standards and legal ability. On November 4, 2013, McKell was admitted in open court to the Supreme Court of the United States Bar. Mike McKell has been named by Utah Business Magazine multiple times as a member of Utah's Legal Elite. In 2014, McKell was selected for his personal injury work. McKell has also been recognized in Super Lawyers as a rising star in the Utah legal market.

== Political career ==
- 2012 - Mckell was chosen out of four candidates at the Republican Primary on June 26, 2012. Mckell then defeated Democratic nominee Brian Hauglid in the general election on November 6, 2012, with 10,779 votes (85.8%).
- 2014 - Mckell defeated Scott Woolston in the Republican convention and went on to win the general election held on November 4, 2014 - against Zachary Lewis with 5,155 votes (84.4%).
- 2020 - ran successfully in his move to the Senate to replace Deidre Henderson, who ran successfully for the position of Lt. Governor.
- 2024 - McKell defeated Alan Hansen in the general election with 38,597 votes (78.74%)

In 2023, McKell sponsored and passed legislation limiting access to social media for minors, making Utah the first state to do so. Since the bill’s passage, 12 other states have enacted bills or adopted resolutions with social media restrictions for minors.

== 2016 sponsored legislation ==
Bill number	Bill name	Bill status
HB0005	Natural Resources, Agriculture, and Environmental Quality Base Budget	Governor Signed - 2/16/2016
HB0064	Rate Committee Amendments	House/ filed - 3/10/2016
HB0073	Financial Disclosure Modifications	House/ filed - 3/10/2016
HB0084S01	Wildlife Amendments	Governor Signed - 3/25/2016
HB0141	Window Tinting Amendments	House/ filed - 3/10/2016
HB0159S01	Line-of-duty Death Benefits Amendments	Governor Signed - 3/25/2016
HB0161	Agriculture Parcel Amendments	Governor Signed - 3/22/2016
HB0192S03	Opiate Overdone Response Act—Pilot Program and Other Amendments	Governor Signed - 3/23/2016
HB0231	Hospital Lien Law Amendments	House/ filed - 3/10/2016
HB0235S01	Remote Transactions Parity Act	House/ filed - 3/10/2016
HB0239	Access to Opioid Prescription Information via Practitioner Data Management Systems	Governor Signed - 3/21/2016
HB0286	Law Enforcement Traffic Safety Amendments	House/ filed - 3/10/2016
HB0311	White Collar Crime Registry Amendments	Governor Signed - 3/28/2016
HJR004S01	Joint Resolution on Water Infrastructure Transfer	House/ to Lieutenant Governor - 3/8/2016
HJR013	Joint Resolution on Nonhazardous Solid Waste Fees	House/ filed - 3/10/2016

McKell also floor sponsored SB0031S01 Tax Commission Levy Process, SB0052S02 Rate Committee Modifications, SB0072 School and Institutional Trust Lands Management Amendments, SB0092 Water Conservation Amendments, SB0110S03 Water Quality Amendments, and SB0138 Health Insurance Coverage for Emergency Care, SB0173S02 State Fair Park Revisions, SB0182S02 Sales and Use Tax Revisions, SB0231 Waste Management Amendments, and SB0246S02 Funding for Infrastructure Revisions.
