= Candice Pierucci =

American politician

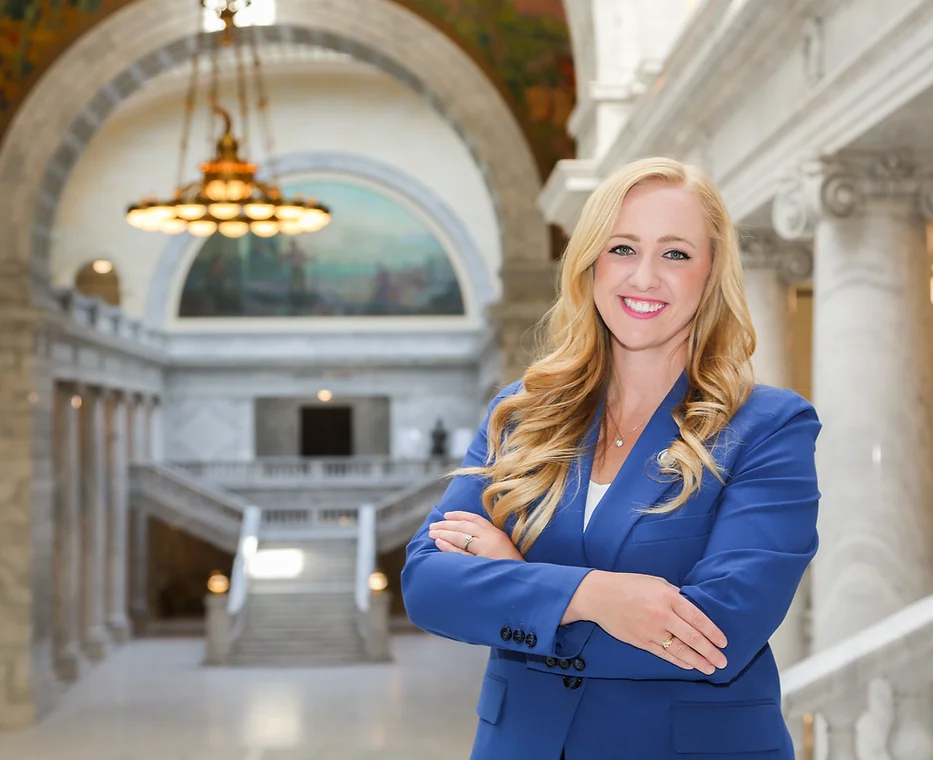

Member of the Utah House of Representatives
- Incumbent
- Assumed office November 5, 2019
- Preceded by: John Knotwell
- Constituency: 52nd district (2019–2023); 49th district (2023–present)

Personal details
- Party: Republican
- Spouse: Andy Pierucci
- Children: 2
- Education: Utah Valley University (BS), University of Utah (MA)

Candice Pierucci is an American politician serving in the Utah House of Representatives, representing District 49, which includes portions of Herriman and Riverton, Utah. At the time of her appointment, she was the youngest member of the Utah Legislature. She is a member of the Republican Party.

== Early life and career ==
Pierucci lives in Riverton and grew up in Herriman. She graduated from Utah Valley University with a bachelor's degree in political science, and a master's in public administration from the University of Utah.

== Political career ==
Prior to her appointment to the legislature, Pierucci interned in the Washington, D.C. office of Sen. Mike Lee, R-Utah, worked for Rep. Chris Stewart, R-Utah, and served as development director for the Sutherland Institute, a conservative think tank.

Pierucci currently serves as chair of the Utah House Education Committee.

== Personal life ==
Pierucci is married to Andy Pierucci. They have one child.
