= Fakakakai =

- Hamlet
- Map showing location of Fakakakai
- Coordinates: 19°41′1.63″S 174°16′33.39″W
- Country: Tonga
- Island grouping: Ha'apai
- Island: Haʻano

Area
  - Total: 0.23 km^{2} (0.089 sq mi)
- Elevation: 7 m (23 ft)

Fakakakai is a settlement on Haʻano Island, Tonga. It falls within the Haʻapai island grouping. The town has a population of 150.

== See also ==
- List of islands and towns in Tonga
