= John Westwood (politician) =

American politician

Member of the Utah House of Representatives from the 72nd district
- Incumbent
- Assumed office January 1, 2013
- Preceded by: Evan Vickers

Personal details
- Born: Richfield, Utah
- Party: Republican
- Education: University of Washington; Southern Utah State College

John R. Westwood (born in Richfield, Utah) is an American politician and a Republican member of the Utah House of Representatives representing District 72 since January 1, 2013. He lives in Cedar City, UT, with his wife Mary Ellen, and their five children.

== Education ==
Westwood attended the University of Washington and earned his BS in business and finance from Southern Utah State College (now Southern Utah University).

== Political career ==
Westwood was elected November 6, 2012. During 2016, he served on the Business, Economic Development and Labor Appropriations Subcommittee, Retirement and Independent Entities Appropriations Subcommittee, the House Economic Development and Workforce Services Committee, House Transportation Committee, and the House Retirement and Independent Entities Committee.

== 2016 Sponsored Legislation ==
Bill number	Bill title	Status
HB0053	Business Resource Centers Amendments	Governor Signed - 3/25/2016
HB0036S02	Payroll Deductions for Union Dues	House/ filed - 3/10/2016

Representative Westwood floor sponsored SB 63 Survey Monument Replacement.

== Elections ==
- 2012 When incumbent Republican Representative Evan Vickers ran for Utah State Senate, Westwood was chosen from among five candidates for the June 26, 2012 Republican Primary which he won with 2,679 votes (67%); and won the November 6, 2012 General election with 10,451 votes (85.4%) against Libertarian candidate Barry Short, who had run for the seat in 2010.
- 2014 Westwood defeated Blake Cozzens in the Republican convention and won the November 4, 2014 General election with 5,210 votes (83.4%) against Libertarian nominee Barry Short and write-in Linda Lou Allen.
