= Stephanie Pitcher =

American politician

Member of the Utah Senate from the 14th district
- Incumbent
- Assumed office January 1, 2023
- Preceded by: Jani Iwamoto (Redistricting)

Member of the Utah House of Representatives from the 40th district
- In office January 1, 2019 – December 31, 2022
- Preceded by: Lynn Hemingway
- Succeeded by: Andrew Stoddard

Personal details
- Party: Democratic
- Education: Utah State University (BA); University of Utah (MPA, JD)

Stephanie Pitcher is an American politician and attorney, and Senator in the Utah State Senate. She served two terms as a member of the Utah House of Representatives from the 40th district, from 2019 through 2022.

== Early life and career ==
Pitcher earned a Bachelor of Arts degree in English creative writing from Utah State University and an MPA from the University of Utah in 2011. In 2015, she earned a Juris Doctor from the S.J. Quinney College of Law.

== Career ==
In 2016, Pitcher helped create the Utah Women's Coalition, which promoted legislation on issues such as family leave, protection of breastfeeding in public, and child care. Pitcher is a prosecutor for Davis County, Utah.

=== State Legislature ===
Pitcher ran against Republican Peter L. Kraus in 2018 for a seat in the Utah House of Representatives, and won with 70% of the vote.

In 2020, Pitcher introduced cash bail reform legislation that was passed by the Utah legislature and signed by Governor Spencer Cox in 2021. The bill introduced requirements that bail decisions reflect risk factors. The intended goal was to prevent people who posed little threat to society spent unnecessary time being imprisoned because they were unable to pay bail.

== Personal life ==
An avid chess player, Pitcher is ranked WCM (Woman candidate master), and has won the Utah State Women's Chess Championship eight times.

== Election history ==
=== 2022 ===
Utah State Senate District 14, general election
| Party | Candidate | Votes | % |
|---|---|---|---|
| Democratic | Stephanie Pitcher | 32,369 | 62.2% |
| Republican | Dan Sorensen | 18,738 | 36.0% |
| United Utah | Dennis Roach | 929 | 1.8% |
| Total votes | | 52,035 | 100% |

Democratic Primary, Utah State Senate District 14
| Party | Candidate | Votes | % |
|---|---|---|---|
| Democratic | Stephanie Pitcher | 5,786 | 60.0% |
| Democratic | Deondra Brown | 1,447 | 40.0% |
| Total votes | | 7,233 | 100% |

=== 2020 ===
Utah House of Representatives District 40, general election
| Party | Candidate | Votes | % |
|---|---|---|---|
| Democratic | Stephanie Pitcher | 13,261 | 69.4% |
| Republican | Jeramiah Clark | 5,841 | 30.6% |
| write-in | David Else | 7 | 0.0% |
| Total votes | | 19,109 | 100% |

=== 2018 ===
Utah House of Representatives District 40, general election
| Party | Candidate | Votes | % |
|---|---|---|---|
| Democratic | Stephanie Pitcher | 11,189 | 69.2% |
| Republican | Peter Kraus | 4,280 | 26.5% |
| Independent American | David Else | 711 | 4.4% |
| Total votes | | 16,180 | 100% |
