= Kevin T. VanTassell =

American politician

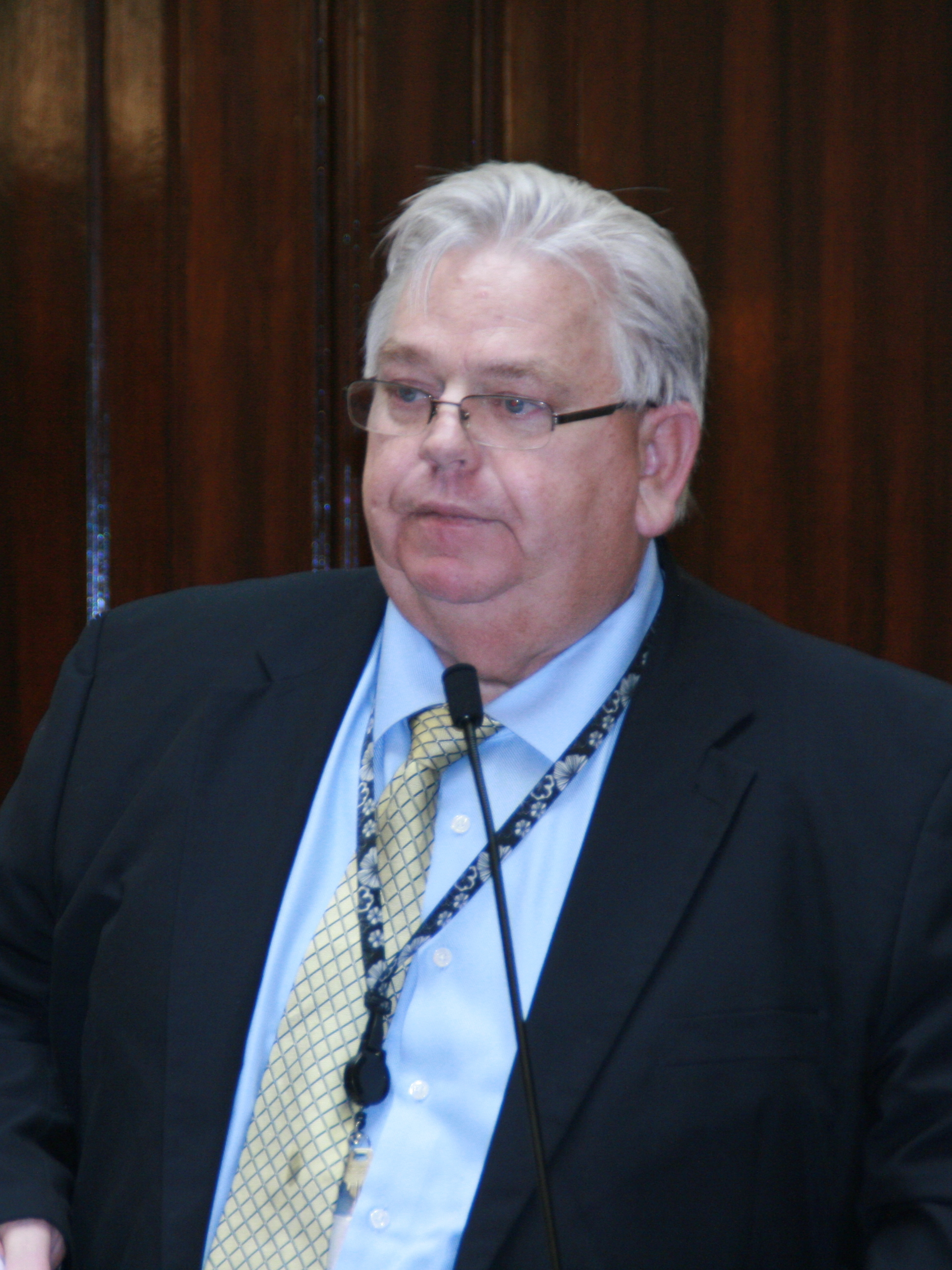

Member of the Utah Senate from the 26th district
- In office January 15, 2007 – present

Personal details
- Born: March 3, 1952 (age 74)
- Party: Republican
- Spouse: Janice
- Education: Brigham Young University
- Occupation: Banker
- Website: Legislative Website

Kevin T. Van Tassell (born March 3, 1952) is an American politician and former manager of Zion's Bank in Vernal, Utah. A Republican, he is a member of the Utah State Senate, representing the state's 26th senate district in Daggett, Duchesne, Summit, Uintah and Wasatch Counties.

== Early life, education, and career ==
Van Tassell attended Brigham Young University and graduated from American Banker's Commercial Lending School. He is a banker by profession. Van Tassell is the past president of the Duchesne County Hospital Board and has been a member of the Intermountain Farmer Board of Directors, Vernal Chamber of Commerce Dinamites, and Vernal Rotary Club.

Van Tassell is married to his wife, Janice, who helps out in the Senate every year. His daughter, Nicole, joined a Mormon polygamist group. Van Tassell sponsored a bill to increase the severity of Utah's polygamy penalties when she chose to leave polygamy.

== Political career ==
Van Tassell was elected to the Senate in 2005 and began his service in 2006. During his legislative service, Van Tassell was the recipient of the Utah Adult Protective Services Outstanding Achievement Award and the "It begins with Me Award" from Zion's Bank. Senator Van Tassell is the Chair for the Senate Rules Committee.

In 2016, Van Tassell served on the following committees:

- Infrastructure and General Government Appropriations Subcommittee
- Natural Resources, Agriculture, and Environmental Quality Appropriations Subcommittee
- Senate Rules Committee (Chair)
- Senate Transportation and Public Utilities and Technology Committee
- Senate Health and Human Services Committee

=== Election ===
==== 2014 ====
2014 Utah State Senate election District 26
Party	Candidate	Votes	%
Republican	Kevin Van Tassell	15,249	69.7%
Democratic	Wayne Stevens	6,622	30.3%

== Legislation ==
=== 2016 sponsored bills ===
Bill Number	Bill Title	Bill Status
S.B. 14	American Indian and Alaskan Native Amendments	Governor Signed 3/18/2016
S.B. 17	Revenue and Taxation Amendments	Governor Signed 3/28/2016
S.B. 118	Uintah Basin Air Quality Research Project	Governor Signed 3/21/2016
S.B. 132	Commercial Driver License Amendments	Governor Signed 3/22/2016
S.B. 159	Severance Tax Exemption Extension	Governor Signed 3/28/2016
S.B. 162	Crime Victims Council Amendments	Governor Signed 3/17/2016
S.B. 173	State Fair Park Revisions	Governor Signed 3/25/2016
S.B. 177	Nighttime Highway Construction Noise Amendments	Governor Signed 3/22/2016
S.B. 200	Compensatory Mitigation Program for Sage Grouse	Governor Signed 3/28/2016
S.B. 236	Utah Communications Authority Governance Amendments	Senate/Filed for bills not passed 3/10/2016
S.C.R. 3	Concurrent Resolution Supporting American Indian and Alaskan Native Education State Plan	Governor Signed 3/1/2016
S.J.R. 15	Joint Rules Resolution—Conference Committees	Senate/To Lieutenant Governor 3/17/2016
S.R 2	Senate Rules Resolution—Rules Committee Notice	Senate/To Lieutenant Governor 3/1/2016
