= Utah's 26th State Senate district =

American legislative district

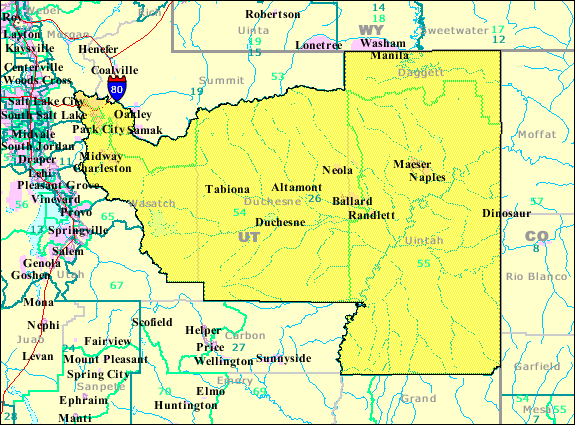
Map of the 26th Utah Senate District.

The 26th Utah Senate District is located in Daggett, Duchesne, Summit, Uintah and Wasatch Counties and includes Utah House Districts 25, 53, 54 and 55. The current State Senator representing the 26th district is David Hinkins. Hinkins was elected to the Utah Senate in 2023.

== Previous Utah State Senators (District 26) ==
Name	Party	Term
Kevin T. VanTassell	Republican	2007–present
Beverly Ann Evans	Republican	1999–2007
Alarik Myrin	Republican	1987–1999
Glade M. Sowards	Republican	1979–1986
Edison J. Stephens	Republican	1978
Robert F. Clyde	Republican	1973–1977
Thorpe A. Waddingham	Democratic	1971–1972
G. Stanford Rees	Republican	1967–1970

== Election results ==
=== 2006 General Election ===
Utah State Senate election, 2006
Party	Candidate	Votes	%	±%
Republican	Keven T. VanTassell	13,562	57.9	
Democratic	Roland Uresk	8,044	34.4	
Constitution	Sonya Ray	1,807	7.7	

=== 2024 General Election ===
Utah State Senate election, 2024
Party	Candidate	Votes	%	±%
Republican	David Hinkins	37,182	69.9	
Democratic	Corbin Frost	12,932	24.3	
Unaffiliated(UN)	Orain Stainbrook	3,112	5.8	

== See also ==
- Kevin T. VanTassell
- Utah Democratic Party
- Utah Republican Party
- Utah Senate
