= Jill Koford =

American politician

Member of the Utah House of Representatives from the 10th district
- Incumbent
- Assumed office January 1, 2025
- Preceded by: Rosemary Lesser
- Succeeded by: Christina Hernandez (elect)

Personal details
- Born: Ogden, Utah
- Party: Republican
- Education: Weber State University; University of Southern California (MEd)
- Website: www.votekoford.com

Jill Koford is an American politician. She serves as a Republican member for the 10th district in the Utah House of Representatives since 2025.

Koford is a small business owner, former educator and instrument rated private pilot.

== Electoral record ==
2024 Utah House of Representatives election, District 10
Party	Candidate	Votes	%
Republican	Jill Koford	8,018	51
Democratic	Rosemary Lesser	7,709	49
Total votes		15,727	100
