= Jefferson Moss =

American politician (born 1976)

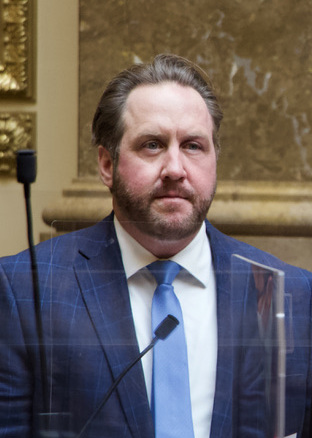

Majority Leader of the Utah House of Representatives
- In office November 15, 2023 – May 30, 2025
- Preceded by: Mike Schultz
- Succeeded by: Casey Snider

Member of the Utah House of Representatives
- In office January 1, 2017 – May 30, 2025
- Preceded by: David Lifferth
- Succeeded by: Leah Hansen
- Constituency: 2nd district (2017–2023); 51st district (2023–2025)

Personal details
- Born: June 4, 1976 (age 50) Saratoga Springs, Utah, U.S.
- Party: Republican
- Education: Brigham Young University (BA, MBA)

Jefferson R. Moss (born July 4, 1976) is an American entrepreneur and politician who served in the Utah House of Representatives, representing the 51st district. He served as the majority leader in the House, a position he assumed on November 15, 2023 when his predecessor in that office, Mike Schultz became the House Speaker. He previously served as majority whip, also succeeding Schultz.

== Early life and education ==
Moss is a native of Orem, Utah. He earned a Bachelor of Arts degree in political science from Brigham Young University and a Master of Business Administration in entrepreneurship and finance from the Marriott School of Business at BYU.

== Career ==
Jefferson Moss is the associate vice president and foundation COO at Utah Valley University. He is also a member of the Utah State Board of Education. He formerly worked as a wealth management advisor at Credit Suisse and as a wealth advisor at KeyBank.

Moss served as House majority leader. He was a member of the Executive Appropriations Committee, Public Education Appropriations Subcommittee, House Business and Labor Committee, and the Legislative Management Committee.

Moss resigned from the Utah House in May 2025 after being appointed as director of the Utah Governor’s Office of Economic Opportunity in the administration of Spencer Cox.

== Personal life ==
Moss resides in Saratoga Springs, Utah, with his wife and four children.

Utah House of Representatives
Preceded by Mike Schultz	Majority Leader of the Utah House of Representatives; 2023–2025	Succeeded by Casey Snider
