= John Knotwell =

American politician (born 1978)

Member of the Utah House of Representatives from the 52nd district
- In office January 1, 2013 – October 26, 2019
- Preceded by: Daniel McCay
- Succeeded by: Candice Pierucci

Personal details
- Party: Republican
- Spouse: Jill
- Children: 5
- Education: Utah Valley University (AS); University of Utah (BS); Utah State University (MBA)
- Website: johnknotwell.com

William John Knotwell III (born January 24, 1978) is an American politician. He was a Republican member of the Utah House of Representatives representing District 52 from January 1, 2013, to October 26, 2019. The district includes Herriman, western Riverton, southwest South Jordan in the State of Utah.

Born to American parents in Subic Bay, Republic of the Philippines, Knotwell spent most of his childhood in Southern California, near San Diego. Knotwell's father was a career United States Navy sailor who spent half his career as an enlisted sailor and half as a Commissioned Warrant Officer.

== Early life and education ==
Knotwell graduated from Poway High School in Poway, California. He attended California State University, Northridge for one year. In December 1997, Knotwell moved to Utah and enrolled as a summer visiting student at Brigham Young University. He was unsuccessful in his attempts to be accepted full-time and later enrolled at Utah Valley State College.

Knotwell earned his Associate of Science in political science from Utah Valley State College (now Utah Valley University), a Bachelor of Science in political science with a minor in history from the University of Utah, and a Masters in Business Administration from Utah State University.

== Career ==
During the 2010 Utah Republican neighborhood caucus, Knotwell was elected to serve as precinct chair, county delegate, and state delegate. He participated in the state and county party conventions and served his term until 2012. In 2011, Knotwell ran for the Herriman City Council to represent District 1. He was unsuccessful in unseating incumbent city councilman Matt Robinson.

In March 2012, Knotwell announced his intention to seek the Republican nomination for Utah House of Representatives. Following the 2010 United States census, the seat was occupied by Daniel McCay was redistricted and became an open seat. Four candidates sought the nomination and Knotwell won on the first ballot with 76% of the vote. In the November 2012 general election he won the popular vote and was designated representative-elect until taking office on January 1, 2013.

== Utah State House of Representatives ==
=== 60th Utah State Legislature (2013–2014) ===
- Committee Assignments
  - Infrastructure and General Government Appropriations Committee, Member
  - House Revenue & Taxation Standing Committee, Member
  - House Transportation Committee, Member
  - Public Utilities & Technology Interim Committee, Member

=== 61st Utah State Legislature (2015–2016) ===
- Committee Assignments
  - House Business & Labor Standing Committee, Vice Chair
  - House Rules Committee, Vice Chair
  - Infrastructure and General Government Appropriations Committee, Member
  - House Revenue & Taxation Standing Committee, Member
  - IT Steering Committee, Member

=== 62nd Utah State Legislature (2017–2018) ===
Representative Knotwell was elected to serve as the majority assistant whip during the 62nd Utah State Legislature. In this capacity, he assists other members of the majority elected leadership to craft the state budget, negotiate priorities among the Utah Senate and governor's office and secure votes among the Utah House of Representatives.

- Committee Assignments
  - Executive Appropriations, Member
  - House Business & Labor Standing Committee, Member
  - House Transportation Standing Committee, Member
  - IT Steering Committee, Member

== Personal life ==
Knotwell lives in Herriman, Utah, and works as senior vice president of global sales at Nuvi. Knotwell and his wife, Jill, have five children.

== Electoral history ==
=== 2012 election ===
Utah House of Representatives, 52nd District, Republican Nominating Convention
Party	Candidate	Votes	%
Republican	John Knotwell	48	76.19
Republican	Joe Ross	7	11.11
Republican	Michelle Baguley	5	7.94
Republican	Jewel K. Skousen	3	4.76
Total votes		63	100.00

Utah House of Representatives, 52nd District, 2012 General Election
Party	Candidate	Votes	%
Republican	John Knotwell	9,928	73.54
Democratic	Daniel Paget	2,958	21.91
Independent	Aaron M. Davis	601	4.45
Total votes		13,501	100.00

=== 2014 election ===
Utah House of Representatives, 52nd District, 2014 General Election
Party	Candidate	Votes	%
Republican	John Knotwell (incumbent)	6,055	76.45
Democratic	Daniel Paget	1,865	23.55
Total votes		7,920	100.00

=== 2016 election ===
Utah House of Representatives, 52nd District, 2016 Republican Nominating Convention
Party	Candidate	Votes	%
Republican	John Knotwell	122	86.50
Republican	Michael Swensen	19	13.40
Total votes		141	100.00

Utah House of Representatives, 52nd District, 2016 General Election
Party	Candidate	Votes	%
Republican	John Knotwell (incumbent)	13,020	74.67
Democratic	Garr K. Smith	4,417	25.33
Total votes		17,437	100
