= Tami Tran =

South Korean-born American politician

- Tran in 2023

Member-elect of the Utah State Senate from the 6th district
- Assuming office January 2027
- Succeeding: Jerry Stevenson

Personal details
- Born: Seoul, South Korea
- Party: Republican
- Spouse: Ly Tran
- Education: Brigham Young University

Tamara "Tami" Lee Tran is a South Korean-born American politician. A member of the Republican Party, she is the member-elect for the 6th district of the Utah State Senate.

== Early life and career ==
Tran was born in Seoul, South Korea, and came to the U.S. as an infant after being adopted. She graduated from Brigham Young University, studying political science.

== Political career ==
Tran was elected to the city council of Kaysville, Utah, in 2019. She was then elected mayor of the city in 2021 and assumed office on January 6, 2022.
