= Jefferson S. Burton =

American politician and Army Major General

Jeff Burton
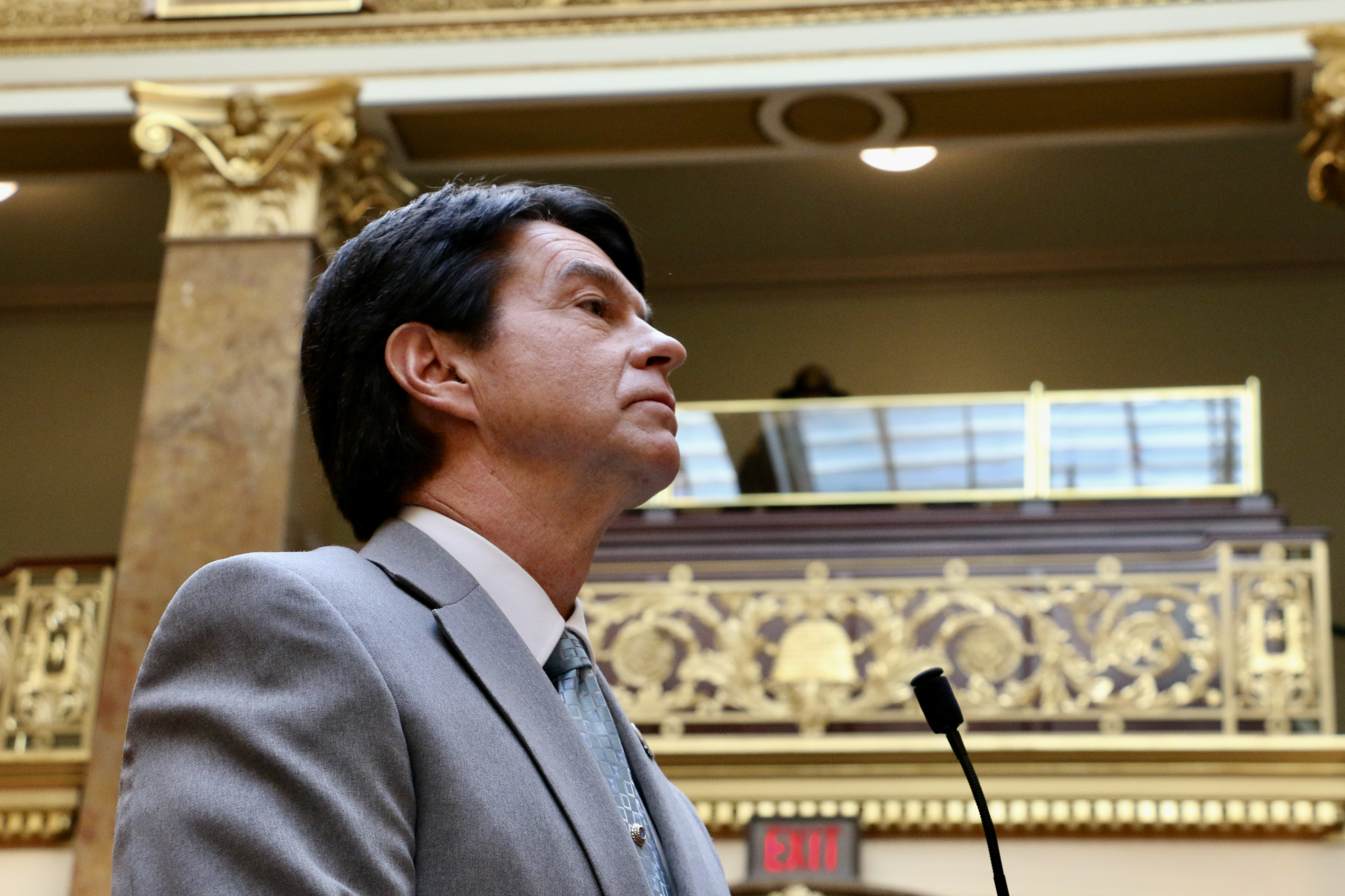

Member of the Utah House of Representatives
- In office January 1, 2021 – 2026
- Preceded by: Mike McKell
- Succeeded by: Jackie Larson
- Constituency: 66th district (2021–2023); 64th district (2023–2026)

Personal details
- Born: Jefferson S. Burton Payson, Utah U.S.

Military service
- Branch/service: United States Army

Jefferson S. Burton is an American politician and retired Army Major General. He is a former member of the Utah House of Representatives representing the 64th district. Elected in 2020, he replaced Mike McKell who moved to a position in the Senate.

During the 2022 General Session, Burton served on the Executive Offices and Criminal Justice Appropriations Subcommittee, House Law Enforcement and Criminal Justice Committee, and the House Political Subdivisions Committee.

== Personal life and education ==
Burton was born and raised in Payson, Utah, graduating from Payson High School. He attended Brigham Young University, enrolling in their ROTC program before leaving school and joining the Army in 1984. He eventually graduated with a Bachelor of Science in Sociology at Regents College, the University of the State of New York (now Excelsior University) in 1986. Burton and his wife live in Spanish Fork, Utah.

== Career ==
Burton served in the United States Army from 1984 to 2019, including the last seven years as Adjutant General of the Utah National Guard. Following his retirement, he was appointed by Utah Governor Herbert to lead day-to-day operations of the Utah Department of Health's COVID-19 response, on the unified command staff. Burton works as the Senior Vice President of Community Development at Zions Bank. He was elected to the Utah House of Representatives in 2020 and assumed office on January 1, 2021. He withdrew his reelection bid in March, 2026, after announcing he would be moving outside of his district. He later resigned his seat.

=== Election ===
After Mike McKell announced he would not seek reelection to the House of Representatives, but instead seek a seat in the Utah State Senate, Burton announced his intention to run for the 64th seat. In the Republican primary, he beat Kari Malkovich, a Woodland Hills City council member, carrying 60% of the vote. He ran uncontested in the 2020 general election. Burton faced public criticism after violating DOD rules by using images of himself in uniform on multiple iterations of his campaign flyers.

== 2022 sponsored legislation ==
Bill	Status
HB 63- Covid-19 Vaccine Exemptions	House/ to Governor 3/14/22
HB 68- Commercial Driver License Amendments	House/ to Governor 3/10/22
HB 97- Identity Theft Reporting System Amendments	House/ to Governor 3/10/22
HB 169- State and Local Employee Disaster Services	House/ to Governor 3/10/22
HJR 11- Joint Resolution Supporting Services for Veterans	House/ enrolled bill to Printing 3/11/22
