= Jerry Stevenson (politician) =

American politician

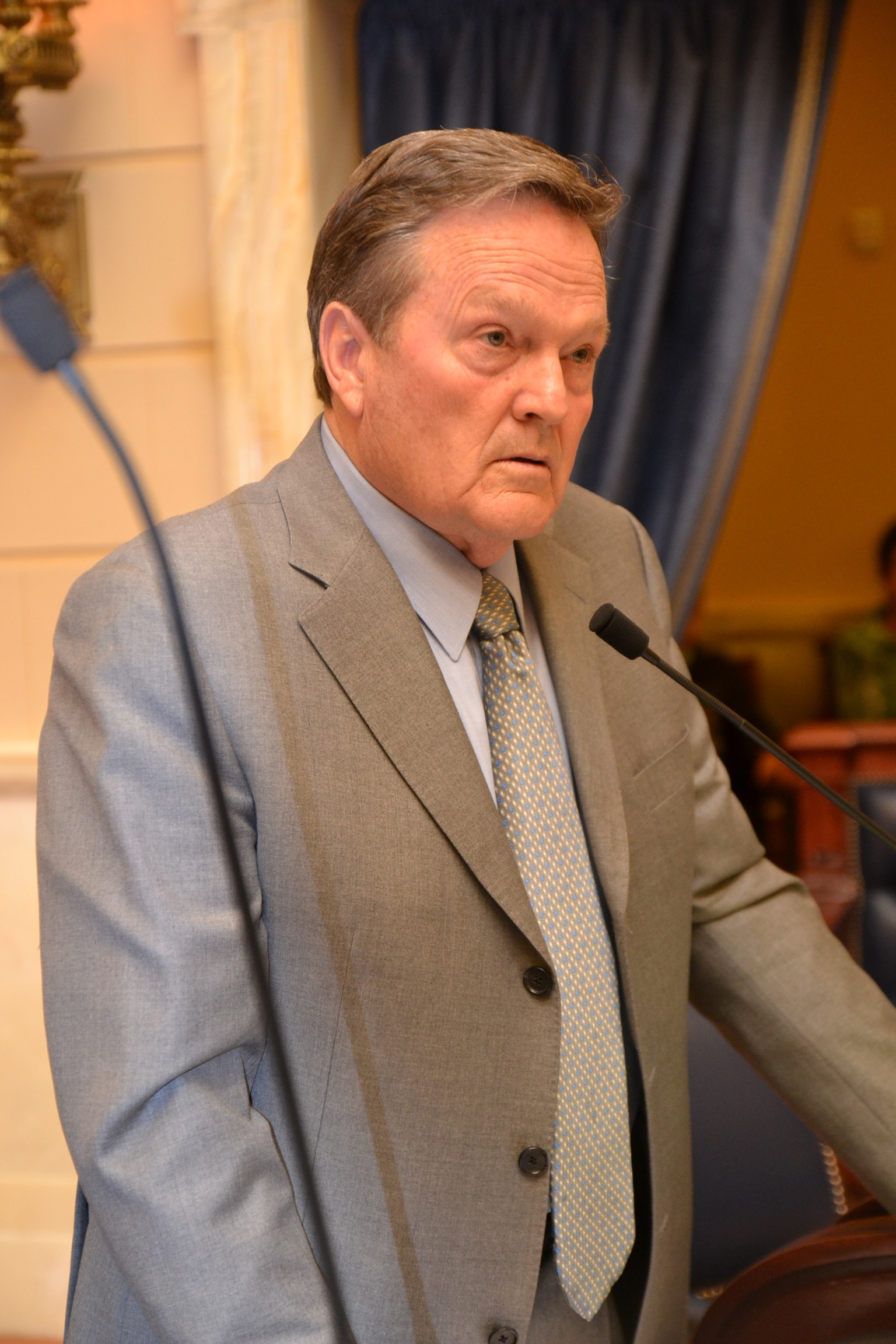
- Stevenson in March 2013

Member of the Utah Senate
- Incumbent
- Assumed office January 25, 2010
- Preceded by: Sheldon Killpack
- Succeeded by: Tami Tran (elect)
- Constituency: 21st district (2010–2023); 6th district (2023–present)

Personal details
- Party: Republican
- Education: Utah State University

Jerry W. Stevenson is an American politician and a Republican member of the Utah State Senate representing District 6 since 2023. Prior to redistricting, he represented District 21 following his January 25, 2010 appointment to fill the vacancy caused by the resignation of Sheldon Killpack. Stevenson was mayor of Layton from 1994 until 2006.

== Early life, education, and career ==
Stevenson attended Utah State University. He has worked as a Weber State University Trustee, the Wasatch Integrated Energy Chair, doing Military Installation, and as the UTA Rail Committee Chair. His primary profession is as a private business owner. Stevenson is married and has children and grandchildren.

== Background ==
- Business Owner
- Weber State University Board of Trustees (chair)
- Envision Utah (former chair)
- DATC Board of Trustees
- Layton City Government
- Layton City Planning Commission (6 years)
- Layton City Council (8 years)
- Layton City Mayor (12 years)

== Political career ==
Senator Stevenson was appointed to his Senate seat on January 25, 2010. Stevenson is serving as a Senator for the Utah Senate.

In 2016, Stevenson served on the following committees:

- Business, Economic Development, and Labor Appropriations Subcommittee
- Executive Appropriations Committee (Senate Vice Chair)
- Higher Education Appropriations Subcommittee
- Senate Economic Development and Workforce Services Committee
- Senate Education Committee
- Senate Ethics Committee

Senator Stevenson's current committees are:

- Economic Development and Workforce Services Interim Committee
- Executive Appropriations Committee
- Higher Education Appropriations Subcommittee
- Point of the Mountain Development Commission
- Political Subdivisions Interim Committee
- Public Education Appropriations Subcommittee
- Senate Business and Labor Committee
- Senate Business and Labor Confirmation Committee
- Senate Economic Development and Workforce Services Committee
- Senate Economic Development and Workforce Services Confirmation Committee
- Senate Judiciary, Law Enforcement, and Criminal Justice Committee
- Senate Natural Resources, Agriculture, and Environment Confirmation Committee

=== Elections ===
2022 Utah State Senate Election District 6
Party	Candidate	Votes	%
Republican	Jerry Stevenson	25,479	100%

2018 Utah State Senate Election District 21
Party	Candidate	Votes	%
Republican	Jerry Stevenson	23,889	71.7%
Democratic	Jake Penrod	9,435	28.3%

2014 Utah State Senate Election District 21
Party	Candidate	Votes	%
Republican	Jerry Stevenson	11,950	78.3%
Democratic	Shari Tatton	3,309	21.7%

== Legislation ==
=== 2016 sponsored bills ===
Bill number	Bill title	Bill status
S.B. 8	State Agency and Higher Education Compensation Appropriations	Governor Signed 3/17/2016
S.B. 114	Municipal Utilities Amendments	Senate/To Governor 3/18/2016
S.B. 217	Alcoholic Beverage Control Act Licensing Amendments	Governor Signed 3/18/2016
S.B. 250	Alcoholic Beverage Policy Amendments	Governor Signed 3/18/2016
S.B. 259	Amendments Related to Alcoholic Beverages	Senate/Filed for bills not passed 3/10/2016
S.C.R 8	Concurrent Resolution Approving the Test and Training Range Land Exchange	Governor Signed 3/10/2016
S.C.R 16	Concurrent Resolution on Utah's Vision for Enduring Contribution to the Common Defense	Governor Signed 3/18/2016

=== Notable legislation ===
During the 2016 legislative session, Senator Stevenson was the floor sponsor for many bills dealing with alcohol laws in Utah. His Senate Bill 250 regulates and clarifies the procedure to sell alcohol through drive-up windows.
