= Landscape contracting =

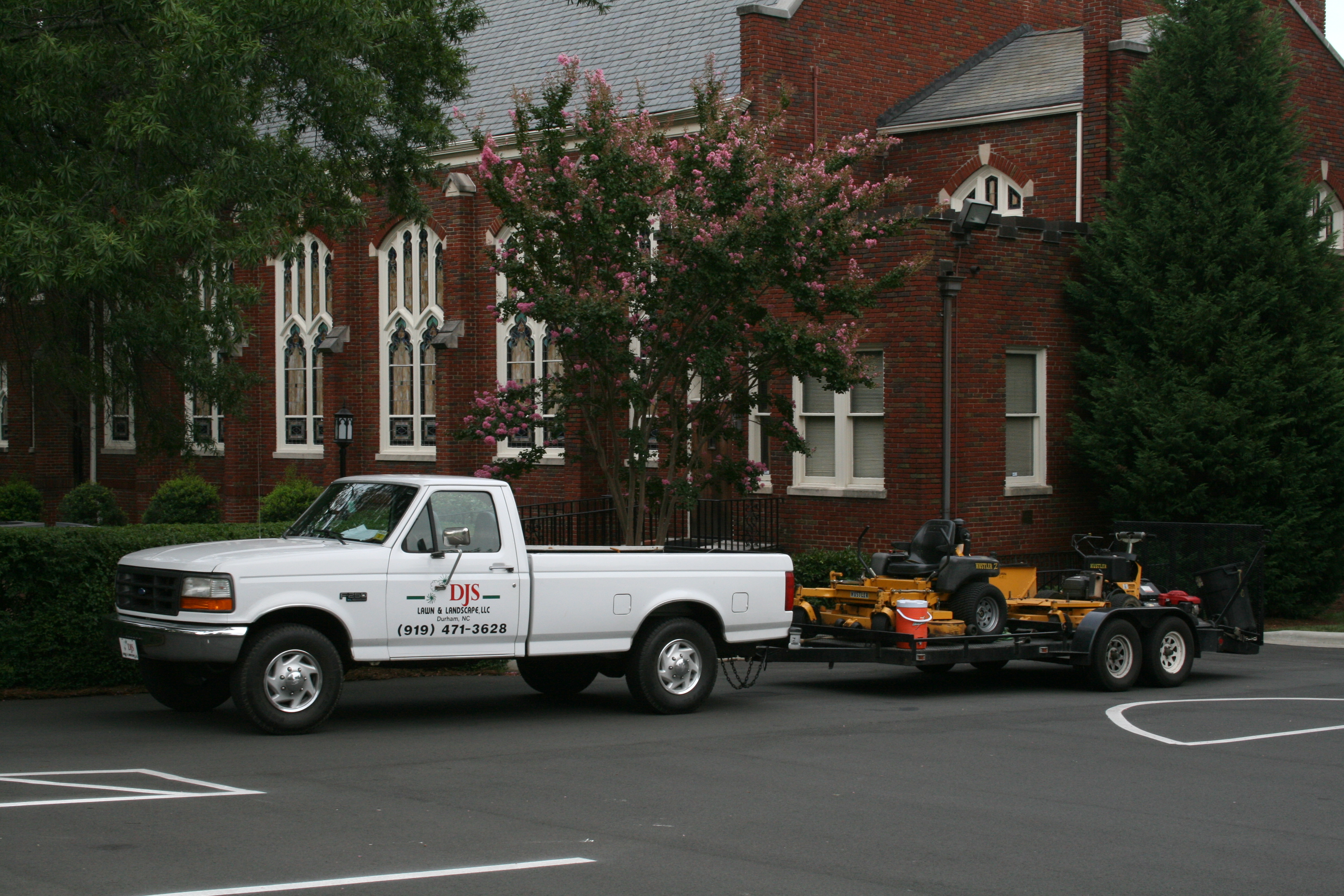
Landscape contractors use various tools and machinery to construct a garden, including large equipment.

Landscape contracting is: "a profession that involves the art and technology of landscape and garden project planning, construction and landscape management, and maintenance and gardening; for garden aesthetics, human enjoyment and safety, and ecosystem-plant community sustainability."

== Education ==
The Bachelor of Science in Landscape Contracting and Management degree was first offered by Mississippi State University in the Department of Landscape Architecture, and has recently begun being offered as a four-year academic major at a number of colleges and universities in the United States, including Penn State University, Oklahoma State University, and University of Massachusetts Amherst, Landscape contracting degrees are accredited by the Professional Landcare Network (PLANET).

== Requirements ==
Landscape contracting is a licensed profession in many jurisdictions in the United States, with requirements varying, but including a combination of formal education, work experience and/or apprenticeship of a certain time length, technical testing, posting a bond, and periodic renewal submittals. Landscape Contracting Associations offer ongoing education, specialty skills certifications, and recognition of outstanding professional accomplishments.

== Collaboration ==
Landscape contractors work in collaboration with clients, landscape designers, landscape architects, garden designers, architects, general contractors, artisans, specialty construction trades, plant nursery growers, and municipal building inspectors, and trade supply stores and manufacturers.

== See also ==
- History of gardening
- Energy-efficient landscaping
- Sustainable landscape architecture
- Sustainable landscaping
- Sustainable gardening
- Landscape ecology
