= Evan Vickers =

American politician (born 1954)

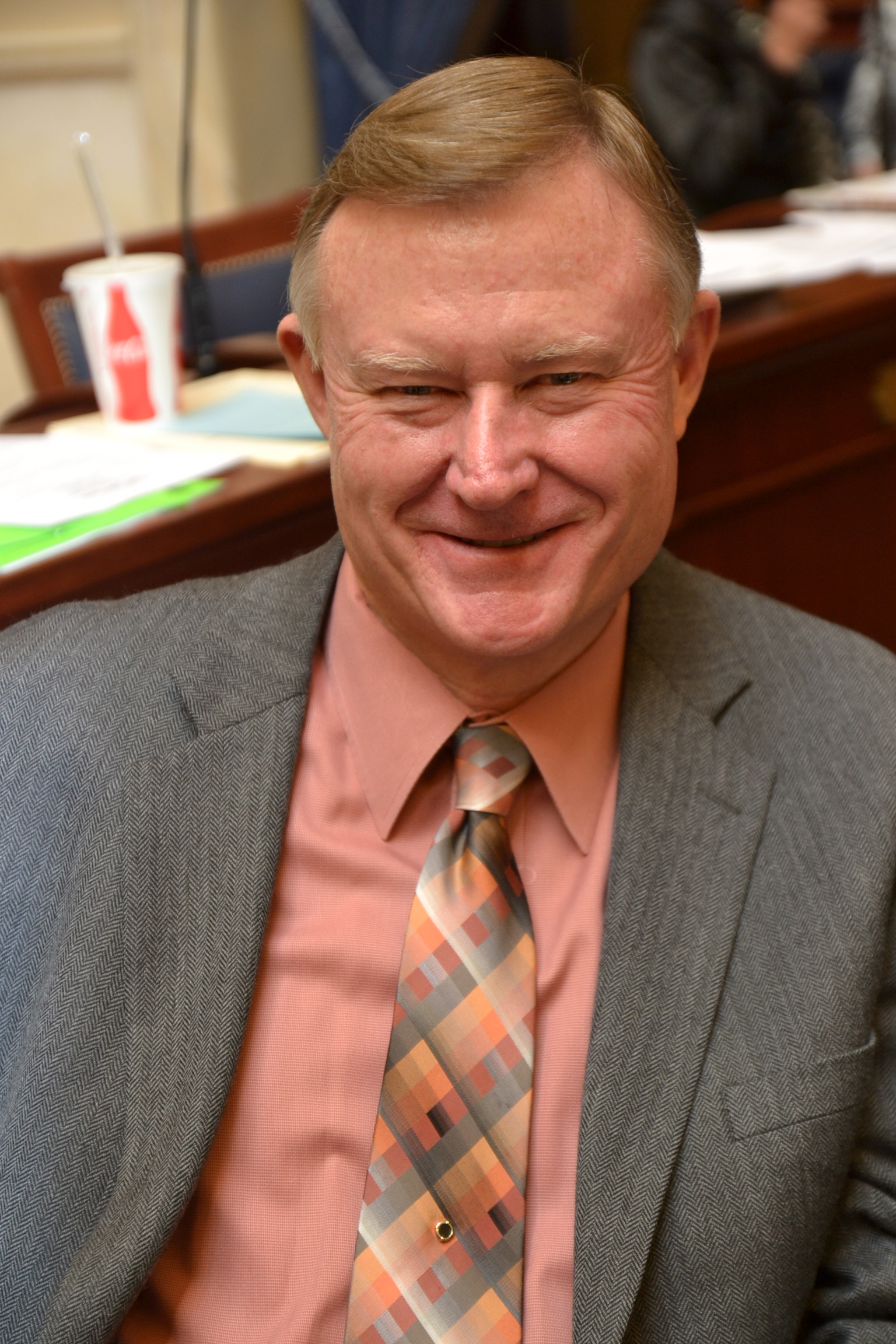

Majority Leader of the Utah Senate
- Incumbent
- Assumed office January 26, 2019
- Preceded by: Ralph Okerlund
- Succeeded by: Kirk Cullimore Jr.

Member of the Utah Senate from the 28th district
- Incumbent
- Assumed office January 1, 2013
- Preceded by: Casey O. Anderson

Member of the Utah House of Representatives from the 72nd district
- In office January 1, 2009 – December 31, 2012
- Preceded by: DeMar Bowman
- Succeeded by: John Westwood

Personal details
- Born: May 15, 1954 (age 72) Panguitch, Utah, U.S.
- Party: Republican
- Education: University of Utah (BS)
- Website: Official website

Evan J. Vickers is an American politician and a Republican member of the Utah State Senate representing District 28 since January 1, 2013. Vickers previously served in the Utah State Legislature from January 1, 2009, until December 31, 2012, in the Utah House of Representatives District 72 seat. He got re-elected on November 8, 2022 and will serve until December 31, 2026

== Personal life, education, and career ==
Vickers earned his BS in pharmacy from the University of Utah. He is a pharmacist by profession and has won the Pharmacist of the Year award from the Utah Pharmacist Association. Vickers has also been associated with the Utah Pharmacists Association (on the board of directors), American Associated Pharmacies (on the board of directors), Iron Mission Foundation Board, and Valley View Medical Center Board of Directors.

Vickers has been married to his wife, Chris for 49 years and they have 5 children together.

== Political career ==
Vickers started his political career by serving on the Cedar City Council from 1987 to 1999. He then served in the House of Representatives from 2009 to 2012. He was elected to his Senate seat in 2012. Throughout his time in the Legislature, Vickers has been awarded the Legislator of the Year for the Utah Pharmacist Association, the NFIB Utah Small Business Champion of the Year, and the Man of the Year.

In 2016, Vickers served on the following committees:

- Business, Economic Development, and Labor Appropriations Subcommittee
- Higher Education Appropriations Subcommittee
- Senate Health and Human Services Committee (chair)
- Senate Natural Resources, Agriculture, and Environment Committee

=== Elections ===
Vickers ran for reelection in 2014 unopposed in the general election and won. He had one challenger in the primary that he beat.

==== 2012 ====
Vickers challenged appointed Republican Senator Casey O. Anderson in the special election June 26, 2012, Republican Primary, winning with 6,549 votes (66%) and won the November 6, 2012, general election with 28,073 votes (82.6%) against Democratic nominee Geoffrey Chestnut.

2012 Utah State Senate election District 24
Party	Candidate	Votes	%
Republican	Evan Vickers	28,073	82.6%
Democratic	Geoffrey Chesnut	5,894	17.4%

==== 2010 ====
Vickers was unopposed for the June 22, 2010, Republican Primary and won the November 2, 2010 general election with 7,356 votes (83.5%) against Libertarian candidate Barry Short.

In 2008 Vickers challenged House District 72 incumbent Republican Representative DeMar Bowman and was selected by the Republican convention for the three-way November 4, 2008 general election, winning with 10,238 votes (74.8%) against Democratic nominee Lawrence Daniel (who had run for the seat in 2006).

2008 Utah State Senate election District 28
Party	Candidate	Votes	%
Republican	Evan Vickers	10,238	
Democratic	Lawrence Daniel	2,140	

== Legislation ==
=== 2016 sponsored bills ===
Bill number	Bill title	Bill status
S.B. 21	Repeal of Health and Human Services Reports and Programs	Governor Signed 3/22/2016
S.B. 50	Health Code Repealer	Governor Signed 3/22/2016
S.B. 61	Smoking in Public Places Amendments	Senate/Filed for bills not passed 3/10/2016
S.B. 89	Medical Cannabidiol Amendments	Senate/Filed for bills not passed 3/10/2016
S.B. 122	Wildland Fire Policy Updates	Governor Signed 3/22/2016
S.B. 136	Division of Occupational and Professional Licensing Amendments	Governor Signed 3/23/2016
S.B. 212	Wildland Fire Suppression Fund	Governor Signed 3/22/2016
S.B. 255	Building Inspector Licensing Amendments	Senate/Filed for bills not passed 3/10/2016
S.C.R.	Concurrent Resolution Recognizing the 20th Anniversary of the Utah Educational Savings Plan	Governor Signed 3/4/2016

Utah State Senate
Preceded by Ralph Okerlund	Majority Leader of the Utah Senate; 2019–2025	Succeeded by Kirk Cullimore Jr.
