= Daniel McCay =

American politician

Member of the Utah Senate
- Incumbent
- Assumed office January 1, 2019
- Preceded by: Howard A. Stephenson
- Constituency: 11th district (2019–2023); 18th district (2023–present)

Member of the Utah House of Representatives from the 41st district
- In office January 1, 2013 – December 31, 2018
- Preceded by: Todd Kiser
- Succeeded by: Mark Strong

Member of the Utah House of Representatives from the 52nd district
- In office January 20, 2012 – January 1, 2013
- Preceded by: Carl Wimmer
- Succeeded by: John Knotwell

Personal details
- Party: Republican
- Education: Grossmont College (attended); Utah State University (BA, MA); Willamette University (JD)

Daniel McCay is an American politician and a Republican member of the Utah Senate representing District 18. Prior to redistricting he represented District 11. He was in the Utah House of Representatives representing District 41 from 2013 through 2018. McCay was initially appointed by Republican Governor of Utah Gary Herbert to fill the vacancy caused by the resignation of Carl Wimmer.

== Political career ==
Redistricted to District 41, and with incumbent Republican Representative Todd Kiser leaving the Legislature and leaving the seat open, McCay was chosen from two candidates by the Republican convention and was unopposed for the November 6, 2012 General election, winning with 13,658 votes.

McCay was unopposed for the June 24, 2014 Republican Primary and won the November 4, 2014 General election with 6,685 votes (70.5%) against Democratic nominee Colleen Bliss.

In 2020, McCay sponsored a bill that bans abortions for any reason besides rape, incest, or the mother’s health that goes into effect automatically if Roe v. Wade is overturned.

McCay has sponsored legislation that bans transgender women in women sports and restricts what kinds of public bathrooms that transgender individuals can use.

In 2024, McCay sponsored legislation to spend $1 billion on building a stadium in Salt Lake City for a potential NHL expansion team.

=== Election history ===
2022 General election, Utah State Senate District 18
Party	Candidate	Votes	%
Republican	Dan McCay	23,873	60.4%
Democratic	Catherine Voutaz	10,246	28.5%
United Utah	Jeff Nordfeld	1,842	5.1%
Total votes		35,961	100%

2018 General election, Utah State Senate District 11
Party	Candidate	Votes	%
Republican	Dan McCay	27,995	67.7%
Democratic	Christian Burridge	13,327	32.3%
Total votes		41,322	100%

2012 General election, Utah House of Representatives District 41
Party	Candidate	Votes	%
Republican	Dan McCay	13,658	100%
	write-in	191	1.38%
Total votes		13,849	100%

2014 General election, Utah House of Representatives District 41
Party	Candidate	Votes	%
Republican	Dan McCay	6,685	70.5%
Democratic	Colleen Bliss	2,797	29.5%
Total votes		9,482	100%

2014 General election, Utah House of Representatives District 41
Party	Candidate	Votes	%
Republican	Dan McCay	6,685	70.5%
Democratic	Colleen Bliss	2,797	29.5%
Total votes		9,482	100%

== Personal life ==
McCay lives in Riverton, Utah with his wife, Tawnee, and their six children. He received degrees at: Bachelors in Secondary Education, Utah State University; Masters in Instructional Design, Utah State University; J. D., Willamette University. McCay is currently an Attorney/Real Estate Portfolio Manager.
