= Brady Brammer =

American politician

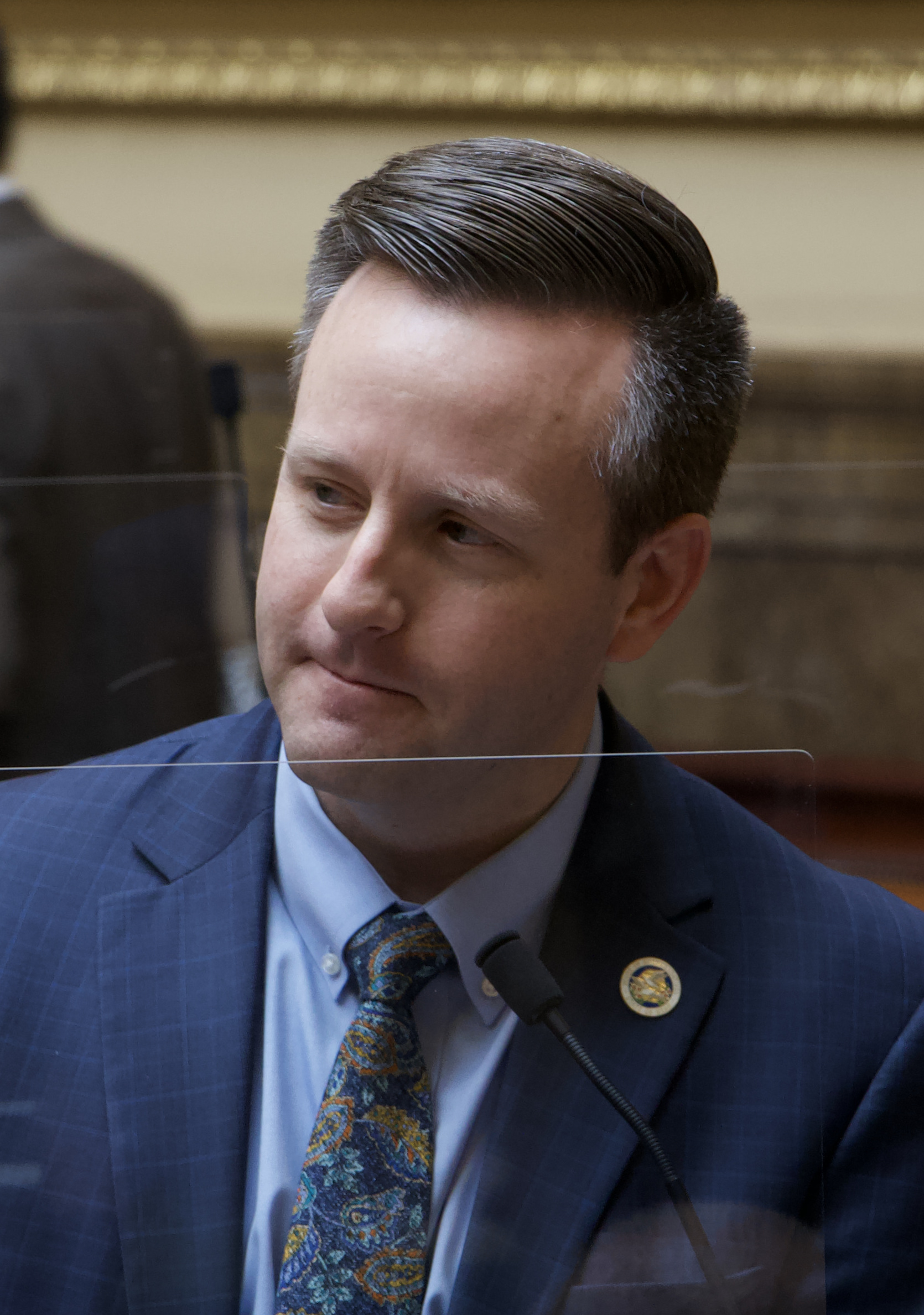

Member of the Utah Senate from the 21st district
- Incumbent
- Assumed office January 1, 2025
- Preceded by: Mike Kennedy

Member of the Utah House of Representatives
- In office January 1, 2019 – January 1, 2025
- Preceded by: Mike Kennedy
- Succeeded by: Kristen Chevrier
- Constituency: 27th district (2019–2023); 54th district (2023–2025)

Personal details
- Party: Republican
- Spouse: Nicki
- Children: 5
- Education: Brigham Young University
- Occupation: Attorney

Brady Brammer is an American Republican politician in the Utah State Senate, representing the 21st district. He previously represented the 54th district in the Utah House of Representatives.

== Political career ==
In 2018, Brammer ran for election to the District 27 seat in the Utah House of Representatives, which was being vacated by fellow Republican Mike Kennedy. He defeated Jared Carman in the Republican primary with 57.5% of the vote, and went on to win the general election with 75.6% of the vote. He is running for re-election in 2020.

In February 2020, Brammer proposed a bill to require warning labels for pornography. A version of the bill became law in April.

As of October 2020, Brammer sits on the following committees:

- Infrastructure and General Government Appropriations Subcommittee
- House Business and Labor Committee
- House Judiciary Committee
- Government Operations Interim Committee
- Judiciary Interim Committee
- Legislative Policy Summit

In November 2024, Brammer was appointed to the Utah State Senate, again to succeed Mike Kennedy after his election to the U.S. House of Representatives.

=== Electoral record ===
2024 general election: Utah House of Representatives, District 54
Party	Candidate	Votes	%
Republican	Brady Brammer	19,780	100
Total votes		19,780	100%

2022 general election: Utah House of Representatives, District 54
Party	Candidate	Votes	%
Republican	Brady Brammer	14,402	80.6%
Democratic	Nikki Pino	2,476	13.9%
United Utah	Andrew Matishen	993	5.6%
Total votes		17,871	100%

2020 general election: Utah House of Representatives, District 27
Party	Candidate	Votes	%
Republican	Brady Brammer	20,733	100%
Total votes		20,733	100%

2018 general election: Utah House of Representatives, District 27
Party	Candidate	Votes	%
Republican	Brady Brammer	12,050	75.6%
Democratic	Elisabeth Luntz	3,050	19.1%
Libertarian	Joseph Geddes Buchman	497	3.1%
Independent American	Curt Crosby	344	2.2%
Total votes		15,941	100%

2018 Republican primary: Utah House of Representatives, District 27
Party	Candidate	Votes	%
Republican	Brady Brammer	3,940	57.5%
Republican	Jared Carman	2,917	42.5%
Total votes		6,857	100%
