= Kirk Cullimore Jr. =

American attorney and politician

Kirk Cullimore

Majority Leader of the Utah Senate
- Incumbent
- Assumed office January 21, 2025
- Preceded by: Evan Vickers

Member of the Utah Senate
- Incumbent
- Assumed office January 1, 2019
- Preceded by: Wayne Niederhauser
- Constituency: 9th district (2019–2023); 19th district (2023–present)

Personal details
- Born: c. 1978 (age 47–48) Sandy, Utah, U.S.
- Education: Utah Valley University (AA); Brigham Young University (BA); University of Oklahoma (JD)

Kirk A. Cullimore Jr. (born c. 1978) is an American attorney and politician serving as a member of the Utah State Senate. Elected in 2018, Cullimore represented the 9th district until 2023. He currently represents the 19th district after being reelected in 2022.

During his tenure in the Utah legislature, he has pushed to allow the legislature to repeal ballot initiatives and ban water fluoridation in Utah public water systems.

== Early life and education ==
Cullimore was born around 1978 and raised in Sandy, Utah. He earned an associate's degree from Utah Valley University, a Bachelor of Arts from Brigham Young University, and a Juris Doctor from the University of Oklahoma College of Law.

== Career ==
After graduating from law school, Cullimore began working as an attorney. He established a private legal practice in 2012. In 2018, Cullimore was elected to the Utah State Senate, succeeding Wayne L. Niederhauser. Cullimore was sworn in on January 1, 2019.

In 2024, Cullimore, as Utah Senate Majority Whip, helped push through an amendment to Utah’s Constitution that gave Utah lawmakers powers to amend and repeal ballot initiatives. Utah Republicans pushed for this amendment to the Constitution after a ballot initiative passed that prohibited partisan gerrymandering.

In 2025, Cullimore sponsored legislation to ban cities or communities from adding fluoride, a mineral that reduces tooth decay, to public water systems.

=== Election History ===
2022, Utah State Senate District 19, general election
Party	Candidate	Votes	%
Republican	Kirk Cullimore	28,020	58.4%
Democratic	Parker Bond	16,626	34.7%
United Utah	Tyler Peterson	3,301	6.9%
Total votes		47,947	100%

2018, Utah State Senate District 9, general election
Party	Candidate	Votes	%
Republican	Kirk Cullimore	24,410	65.2%
United Utah	Alexander Castagno	12,639	33.8%
-	write-in	381	1.0
Total votes		27,430	100%

Utah State Senate
Preceded by Evan Vickers	Majority Leader of the Utah Senate; 2025–present	Incumbent
