= Casey O. Anderson =

American politician

Member of the Utah Senate from the 28th district

Utah State Senate
- In office May 7, 2011 – January 2013

County Commissioner
- In office January 2016 – December 31st, 2016

Personal details
- Party: Republican
- Spouse: Heidi Anderson
- Occupation: Chief Administrative Officer, GOGreen Enterprises.

Casey O. Anderson was the winner of a special election to the Utah State Senate on May 7, 2011. He ran for a full term in 2012 but was defeated in the Republican primary by Evan J. Vickers, 63-37%.
