= 2023 United States House of Representatives elections =

- February 21 – November 21, 2023

3 of the 435 seats in the United States House of Representatives 218 seats needed for a majority
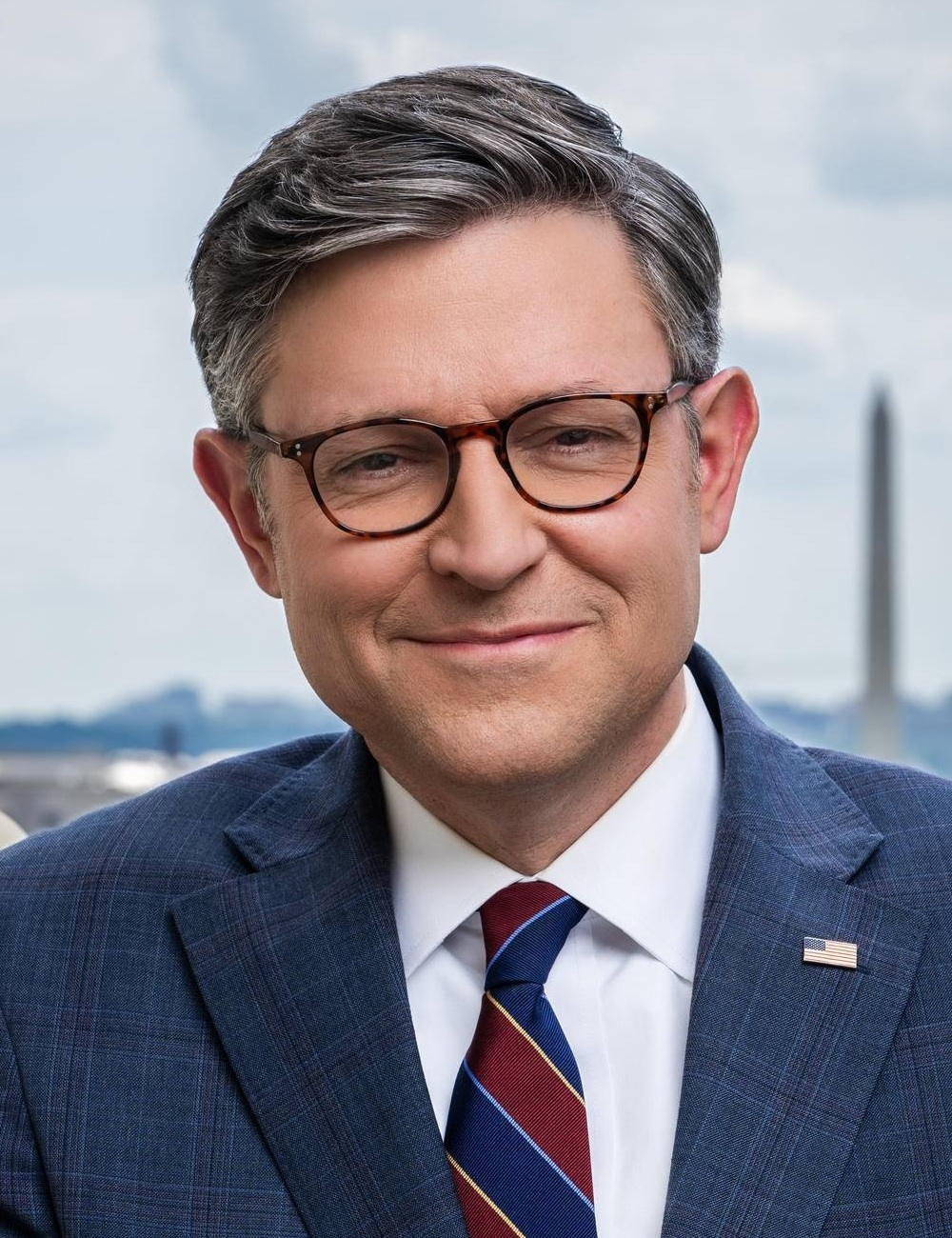

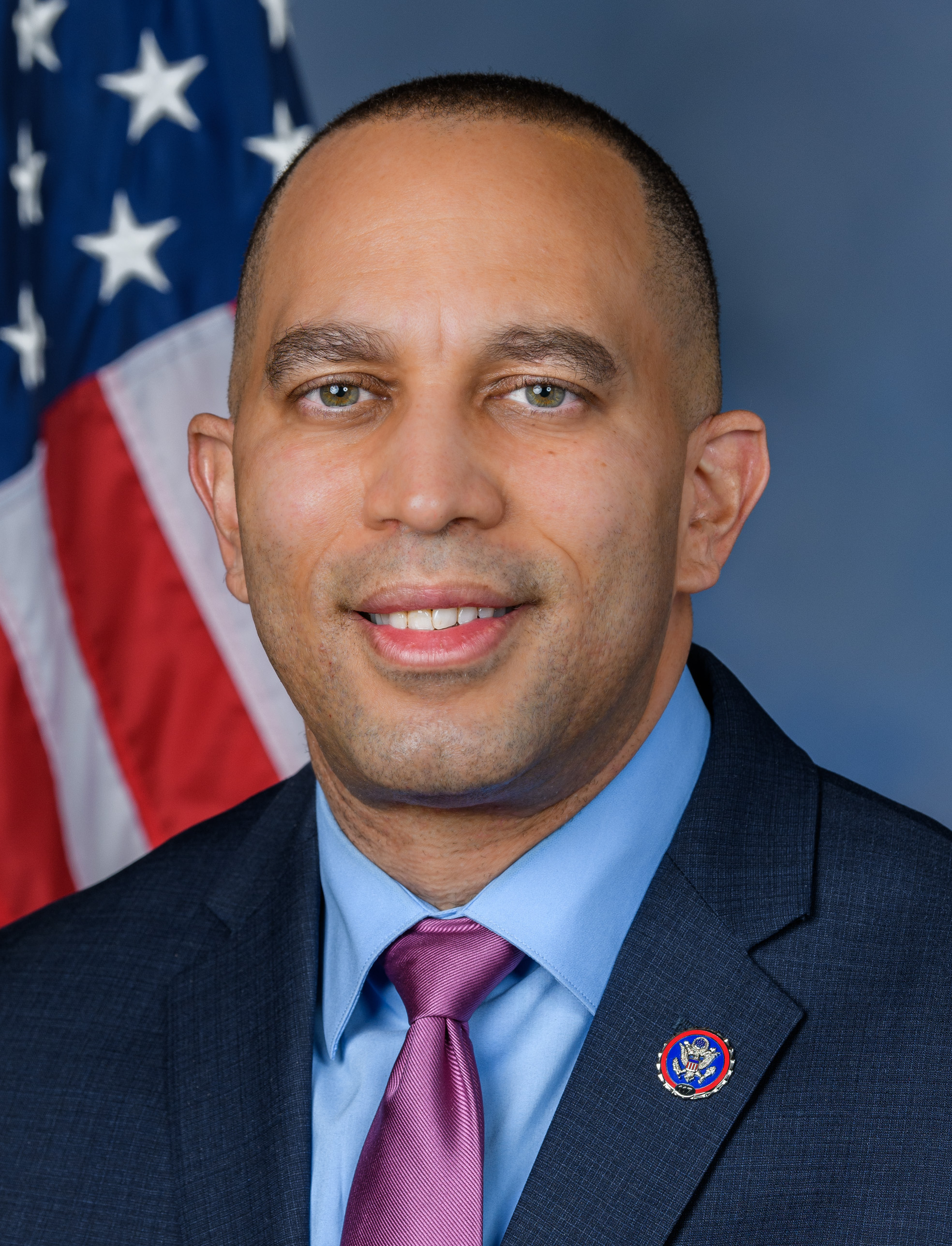
	Majority party	Minority party
Leader	Mike Johnson	Hakeem Jeffries
Party	Republican	Democratic
Leader since	October 25, 2023	January 3, 2023
Leader's seat	Louisiana 4th	New York 8th
Last election	222 seats, 50.6%	213 seats, 47.8%
Seats after	222	213
Seat change	Steady	Steady
Seats up	1	2
Races won	1	2
- Democratic hold Republican hold No election

There were three special elections to the United States House of Representatives in 2023 during the 118th United States Congress.

== Summary ==
District	Incumbent			This race	
District	Member	Party	First elected	Results	Candidates
Virginia 4	Donald McEachin	Democratic	2016	Incumbent won reelection, but died November 28, 2022 at the end of the previous Congress. New member elected February 21, 2023. Democratic hold.	▌ ✓ Jennifer McClellan (Democratic) 74.4%; ▌Leon Benjamin (Republican) 25.5%
Rhode Island 1	David Cicilline	Democratic	2010	Incumbent resigned May 31, 2023. New member elected November 7, 2023. Democratic hold.	▌ ✓ Gabe Amo (Democratic) 64.7%; ▌Gerry Leonard Jr. (Republican) 35.0%
Utah 2	Chris Stewart	Republican	2012	Incumbent resigned September 15, 2023. New member elected November 21, 2023. Republican hold.	▌ ✓ Celeste Maloy (Republican) 57.1%; ▌Kathleen Riebe (Democratic) 33.6%; ▌Bradley Garth Green (Libertarian) 2.9%; ▌Cassie Easley (Constitution) 2.3%; ▌January Walker (United Utah) 1.8%; ▌Perry Myers (Independent) 1.4%; ▌Joseph Buchman (Independent) 0.8%

== Virginia's 4th congressional district ==
Virginia's 4th congressional district

Incumbent Democrat Donald McEachin died on November 28, 2022, of colorectal cancer, before he was seated to his fourth term in the 118th Congress. Governor Glenn Youngkin called a special election for February 21, 2023, with the general election filing deadline set for December 23, 2022. The Democratic Party chose to hold its "firehouse primary" on December 20, just 8 days after the special election date was set.

State senator Jennifer McClellan won the primary in a landslide, and subsequently defeated pastor Leon Benjamin in the general election, becoming the first black woman to represent Virginia in Congress.

2023 Virginia's 4th congressional district special election
Party	Candidate	Votes	%
Democratic	Jennifer McClellan	82,040	74.41
Republican	Leon Benjamin	28,083	25.47
Write-in		129	0.12
Total votes		110,252	100.00
Democratic hold			

== Rhode Island's 1st congressional district ==
Rhode Island's 1st congressional district

Incumbent Democrat David Cicilline resigned on May 31, 2023, to take a job at the Rhode Island Foundation. The election was held on November 7, with primaries on September 5.

2023 Rhode Island's 1st congressional district special election
Party	Candidate	Votes	%
Democratic	Gabe Amo	43,290	64.73
Republican	Gerry Leonard Jr.	23,393	34.98
Write-in		193	0.29
Total votes		66,876	100.00
Democratic hold			

== Utah's 2nd congressional district ==
Utah's 2nd congressional district

Incumbent Republican Chris Stewart resigned on September 15, 2023, due to his wife's ongoing health issues. The election was held on November 21, 2023, with primaries on September 5, as determined by Governor Spencer Cox.

2023 Utah's 2nd congressional district special election
Party	Candidate	Votes	%
Republican	Celeste Maloy	89,866	57.07
Democratic	Kathleen Riebe	52,949	33.62
Libertarian	Bradley Green	4,528	2.88
Constitution	Cassie Easley	3,678	2.34
United Utah	January Walker	2,856	1.81
Independent	Perry Myers	2,276	1.45
Independent	Joseph Buchman	1,281	0.81
Write-in		39	0.02
Total votes		157,473	100.00
Republican hold			
