= Roosevelt Park =

Roosevelt Park may refer to:

== United States ==
=== Parks ===
- Roosevelt Park (Albuquerque, New Mexico)
- Roosevelt Park (Edison, New Jersey)
- Roosevelt Park (Malden), Massachusetts
- Roosevelt Park (Minot), North Dakota
- Roosevelt Park (San Antonio), in Texas
- Roosevelt Park, the location of Michigan Central Station in Detroit, Michigan
- Roosevelt State Park, Mississippi
- Franklin Delano Roosevelt Park, South Philadelphia, Pennsylvania
- Sara D. Roosevelt Park, New York, New York
- Theodore Roosevelt National Park, North Dakota

=== Other ===
- Roosevelt Park, Michigan, a city
- Roosevelt Park Zoo, a zoo in Minot, North Dakota
- Roosevelt Park, a senior housing project in Millville, New Jersey

== Elsewhere ==
- Roosevelt Park Elementary School, a school in Prince Rupert, British Columbia, Canada
- Roosevelt Protected Landscape, also known as Roosevelt Park, in Bataan, Philippines
- Franklin Roosevelt Park, a suburb of Johannesburg, South Africa

== See also ==
- Theodore Roosevelt Park (disambiguation)
