= David Clark (Utah politician) =

American politician and banker from Utah

Member of the Utah House of Representatives from the 74th district
- In office January 1, 2001 – November 2011
- Preceded by: Dennis Iverson

Speaker of the Utah House of Representatives
- In office November 2008 – November 2011
- Preceded by: Greg Curtis
- Succeeded by: Becky Lockhart

Personal details
- Born: July 3, 1953 (age 73)
- Party: Republican Party
- Spouse: Nan
- Children: 4
- Occupation: Banker

David Clark (born July 3, 1953) is an American politician and banker from Utah. A Republican, he was a member of the Utah State House, representing the state's 74th house district in Santa Clara. He was elected by his colleagues in November 2006 to serve as Majority Leader in the Utah House. In November 2008 he was elected Speaker of the House and served two terms in that capacity.

== Early life, education, and banking career ==
David Clark was born in Provo, Utah. He graduated from Brigham Young University, where he played football for coach LaVell Edwards. He also attended National Commercial Lenders Graduate School and Pacific Coast School of Banking. In 1976, he became President of Regional Banking of Zions Bank.

== Utah House of Representatives ==
=== Elections ===
In 2000, Clark decided to run for the Utah House of Representatives. He defeated incumbent Republican State Representative Dennis Iverson in the primary 51%-49%. He won the general election unopposed. He won re-election 2002 (74%), 2004 (92%), 2006 (72%), 2008 (72%), and 2010 (78%).

=== Tenure ===
Legislative accomplishments

Clark is best known for his work on health care issues, helping to create Utah’s Health Insurance Exchange (signed into law by Governor Utah’s Health Insurance Exchange and chairing the Health Reform Task Force while serving as speaker.

Party Leadership

Clark became Majority Leader in 2007 and Speaker of the House in 2009. However, in December 2010 State Representative Becky Lockhart (R-Provo) defeated Clark by only one vote (30-28).

=== Committee assignments ===
- Health and Human Services Interim Committee
- House Health and Human Services Committee
- House Revenue and Taxation Committee
- House Rules Committee
- Revenue and Taxation Interim Committee
  - Social Services Appropriations Subcommittee (Chairman)

== 2012 congressional election ==
In November 2011, he decided to resign his seat to run for the congress in Utah's 2nd congressional district. The seat is being vacated by incumbent Democrat Jim Matheson, who is running in Utah's newly-drawn 4th congressional district. He officially launched his bid on January 13, 2012. Clark was defeated for the Republican nomination by Chris Stewart, who ultimately won the seat.

== Personal life ==
Clark and his wife Nan have four children and live in Santa Clara. He is a member of the Church of Jesus Christ of Latter-day Saints.
