= Jay Seegmiller =

Jay Seegmiller may refer to:

- Jay Seegmiller (politician), member of the Utah House of Representatives
- J. Edwin Seegmiller, American physician and biochemical geneticist
