= 2023 Utah's 2nd congressional district special election =

- November 21, 2023

Utah's 2nd congressional district
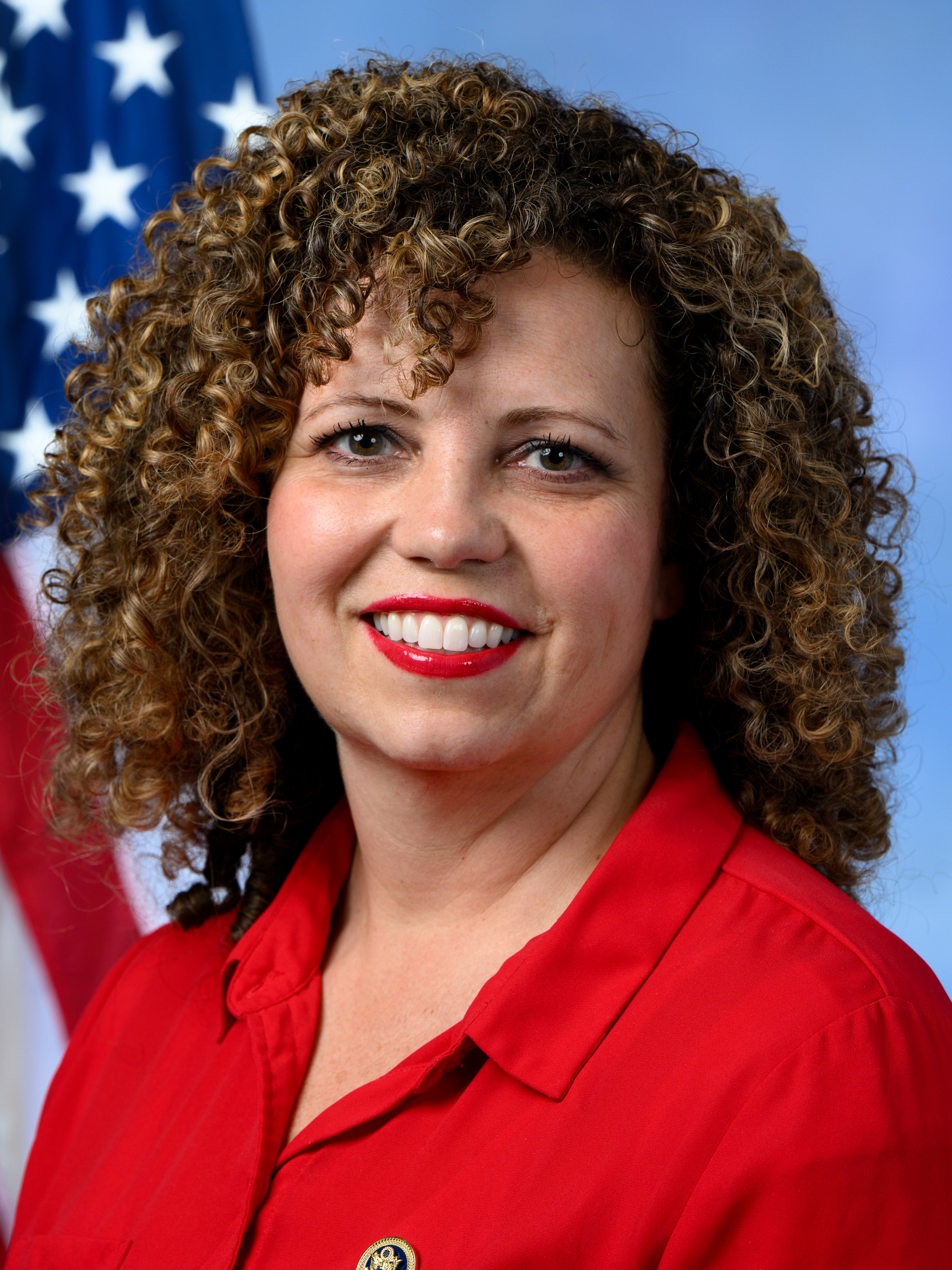

Nominee	Celeste Maloy	Kathleen Riebe
Party	Republican	Democratic
Popular vote	89,866	52,949
Percentage	57.1%	33.6%
- County results Maloy: 50–60% 60–70% 70–80% 80–90% Riebe: 60–70%
U.S. Representative before election
Chris Stewart
Republican
Elected U.S. Representative
Celeste Maloy
Republican

The 2023 Utah's 2nd congressional district special election was held on November 21, 2023, to choose a new member of the U.S. House of Representatives. The seat became vacant following Republican representative Chris Stewart's resignation on September 15, 2023, due to his wife's ongoing health issues.

On June 7, 2023, Utah governor Spencer Cox declared that the special election would be held on November 21, 2023, with the primary being held on September 5, 2023. This was the first congressional special election in Utah since the 2017 election in the 3rd district following the resignation of Jason Chaffetz, and only the second since 1930.

Celeste Maloy, Stewart's legal counsel, won the Republican convention. Her victory was considered an upset, as former Utah House Speaker Greg Hughes led every round of voting except for the final. Two other candidates, former Republican National Committee member Bruce Hough and former state representative Becky Edwards, qualified for the Republican primary via petition. Some Republicans filed a lawsuit to remove Maloy from the ballot after it was revealed that her Utah voter registration was inactive, as she had moved to Virginia while working for Stewart; however, the lawsuit was rejected.

Democrats nominated state senator Kathleen Riebe. The 2nd district is considered a safe Republican seat, with a Cook PVI of R+11. Stewart was re-elected with 59.7% of the vote in 2022. Donald Trump won the district with 56.7% of the vote in the 2020 presidential election.

== Republican primary ==
=== Candidates ===
Eleven candidates competed at the Republican convention on June 24. Celeste Maloy won, guaranteeing her a spot on the primary ballot. Two candidates who lost at the convention, Becky Edwards and Bruce Hough, also qualified for the ballot by collecting signatures.

Edwards's candidacy attracted attention due to her controversial stances; she voted for Joe Biden in the 2020 presidential election, disagreed with the overturning of Roe v. Wade, supported the second impeachment of Donald Trump, and challenged U.S. Senator Mike Lee in his 2022 primary.

==== Nominee ====
- Celeste Maloy, counsel for then-U.S. representative Chris Stewart

==== Eliminated in primary ====
- Becky Edwards, former state representative from HD-20 (2009–2018) and candidate for U.S. Senate in 2022
- Bruce Hough, former Republican National Committee member, former chair of the Utah Republican Party, and father of dancers Derek Hough and Julianne Hough

==== Lost at convention ====
- Kathleen Anderson, communications director for the Utah Republican Party and candidate for Utah's 4th congressional district in 2020
- Henry Eyring, Duke University professor and grandson of LDS Church Second Counselor Henry B. Eyring
- Scott Hatfield, congressional staffer
- Jordan Hess, former vice chair of the Utah Republican Party (endorsed Maloy)
- Greg Hughes, former Speaker of the Utah House of Representatives (2015–2018) from HD-51 (2003–2018) and candidate for Governor of Utah in 2020

==== Withdrew during convention ====
- Quin Denning, construction contractor
- Bill Hoster, mayor of Leeds (endorsed Hughes)
- Scott Reber, realtor and former congressional staffer (endorsed Maloy)

==== Withdrew before convention ====
- Tyrone Jensen, political podcaster, candidate for U.S. Senate in 2018 and 2022, and candidate for this district in 2020

==== Disqualified ====
- Remy Bubba Kush

==== Declined ====
- Sheryl Allen, former state representative from HD-19 (1994–2011)
- Gil Almquist, Washington County commissioner
- Kathleen Anderson, communications director for the Utah Republican Party and candidate for Utah's 4th congressional district in 2020
- Robert Axson, chair of the Utah Republican Party (2023–present)
- Brad Bonham, entrepreneur
- Walt Brooks, state representative from HD-75 (2016–present)
- Derek Brown, former chair of the Utah Republican Party (2019–2021) and former state representative from HD-49 (2011–2014)
- Daniel McCay, state senator from SD-18 (2019–present)
- Kim Coleman, former state representative from HD-42 (2015–2021) and candidate for the 4th district in 2020
- Ben Horsley, chief of staff for the Granite School District
- Victor Iverson, chair of the Washington County Commission
- Carson Jorgensen, former chair of the Utah Republican Party (2021–2023)
- Mike Kennedy, state senator from SD-21 (2021–present) and candidate for U.S. Senate in 2018
- Derek Miller, president of the Salt Lake Chamber of Commerce
- Aimee Winder Newton, Salt Lake County councilor from the 3rd district (2014–present) and candidate for Governor of Utah in 2020
- Corey Norman, chief of staff to U.S. Representative John Curtis
- Jason Perry, director of the Hinckley Institute of Politics
- John Pike, former mayor of St. George
- Sean Reyes, Utah Attorney General (2013–present)
- Erin Rider, attorney, former staffer for then-U.S. Senator Orrin Hatch, and candidate for this district in 2022
- Adam Snow, Washington County commissioner
- Trent Staggs, mayor of Riverton and nominee for mayor of Salt Lake County in 2020 (running for U.S. Senate)
- Bob Stevenson, Davis County commissioner and candidate for Utah's 1st congressional district in 2020
- Todd Weiler, state senator from SD-08 (2012–present)
- Thomas Wright, former chair of the Utah Republican Party and candidate for Governor of Utah in 2020

=== Endorsements ===
Greg Hughes (lost at convention)

Local officials

- Bill Hoster, mayor of Leeds and candidate for this seat in 2023
Celeste Maloy

U.S. Cabinet officials

- David Bernhardt, former United States Secretary of the Interior (2019–2021)

U.S. representatives

- Rob Bishop, UT-01 (2003–2021)
- Chris Stewart, UT-02 (2013–2023)

Individuals

- Jordan Hess, former vice chair of the Utah Republican Party and candidate for this seat in 2023 (Eliminated at convention)
- Scott Reber, realtor, former congressional staffer, and candidate for this seat in 2023 (Eliminated at convention)
Bruce Hough

Individuals

- Scott Hatfield, former candidate for this seat (Eliminated at convention)

=== Fundraising ===
Campaign finance reports as of August 16, 2023
Candidate	Raised	Spent	Cash on hand
Becky Edwards (R)	$678,975 (Note: $300,000 of this total was self-funded by Edwards)	$450,629	$228,346
Bruce Hough (R)	$538,700 (Note: $334,236 of this total was self-funded by Hough)	$453,801	$84,899
Celeste Maloy (R)	$307,308	$217,563	$89,745
Source: Federal Election Commission

=== Polling ===
Poll source	Date(s) administered	Sample size (Note: Key: A – all adults RV – registered voters LV – likely voters V – unclear)	Margin of error	Becky Edwards	Bruce Hough	Celeste Maloy	Undecided
Dan Jones & Associates	August 7–14, 2023	471 (RV)	± 4.51%	32%	11%	9%	47%

=== Pre-convention debate ===
Pre-convention debate
No.	Date	Host	Moderator	Link	Republican	Republican	Republican	Republican	Republican	Republican	Republican	Republican	Republican	Republican	Republican
Key: P Participant A Absent N Not invited I Invited W Withdrawn															
Key: P Participant A Absent N Not invited I Invited W Withdrawn					Kathleen Anderson	Quin Denning	Becky Edwards	Henry Eyring	Scott Hatfield	Jordan Hess	Bill Hoster	Bruce Hough	Greg Hughes	Celeste Maloy	Scott Reber
1	Jun. 20, 2023	KTVX	Rob Axson; Glen Mills	YouTube (part 1); YouTube (part 2)	P	P	P	P	P	P	P	P	P	P	P

=== Convention results ===
Republican convention results
Candidate	First ballot		Second ballot		Third ballot		Fourth ballot		Fifth ballot	
Candidate	Votes	%	Votes	%	Votes	%	Votes	%	Votes	%
Celeste Maloy	178	24.1%	199	27.0%	210	28.6%	244	33.2%	380	52.1%
Greg Hughes	211	28.5%	240	32.6%	259	35.2%	300	40.9%	349	47.9%
Jordan Hess	149	20.1%	163	22.1%	169	23.0%	155	21.1%	Eliminated	
Henry Eyring	60	8.1%	54	7.3%	46	6.3%	35	4.8%	Eliminated	
Bill Hoster	47	6.4%	33	4.5%	30	4.1%	Withdrawn			
Becky Edwards	37	5.0%	27	3.7%	21	2.9%	Eliminated			
Kathleen Anderson	14	1.9%	13	1.8%	Eliminated					
Bruce Hough	14	1.9%	8	1.1%	Eliminated					
Quin Denning	13	1.8%	Withdrawn							
Scott Reber	13	1.8%	Withdrawn							
Scott Hatfield	4	0.5%	Eliminated							

=== Post-convention debate ===
Post-convention debate
No.	Date	Host	Moderator	Link	Republican	Republican	Republican
Key: P Participant A Absent N Not invited I Invited W Withdrawn							
Key: P Participant A Absent N Not invited I Invited W Withdrawn					Becky Edwards	Bruce Hough	Celeste Maloy
1	Aug. 15, 2023	KSL-TV		YouTube	A	P	P

=== Primary results ===
Results by county: Maloy: Maloy—70–80%; Maloy—50–60%; Maloy—40–50%; Edwards: Edwards—50–60%; Edwards—40–50%; Hough: Hough—30–40%; Tie: Three-way tie—30–40%

Republican primary results
Party	Candidate	Votes	%
Republican	Celeste Maloy	36,288	38.8
Republican	Becky Edwards	30,560	32.7
Republican	Bruce Hough	26,562	28.4
Total votes		93,410	100.0

== Democratic primary ==
=== Candidates ===
==== Nominee ====
- Kathleen Riebe, state senator from SD-15 (2019–present)

==== Lost in convention ====
- Guy Warner, tech executive
- Archie Williams, heavy equipment operator and perennial candidate

==== Declined ====
- Ben McAdams, former U.S. representative from Utah's 4th congressional district (2019–2021)
- Kael Weston, former U.S. State Department official, nominee for this district in 2020, and candidate for U.S. Senate in 2022
- Nick Mitchell, inventor, small business owner, and nominee for this district in 2022

=== Convention results ===
Democratic convention results
Candidate	First ballot	
Candidate	Votes	%
Kathleen Riebe	243	85.56%
Guy Warner	36	12.67%
Archie Williams III	5	1.76%

=== Fundraising ===
Campaign finance reports as of August 16, 2023
Candidate	Raised	Spent	Cash on hand
Kathleen Riebe (D)	$94,451	$48,548	$45,902
Source: Federal Election Commission

== Third-party and independent candidates ==
=== United Utah Party ===
==== Nominee ====
- January Walker, cybersecurity professional and nominee for Utah's 4th congressional district in 2022

===== Lost convention =====
- Stone Fonua, tax preparer and perennial candidate

===== Convention results =====
United Utah convention results
Candidate	First ballot
January Walker	81%
Stone Fonua	19%

=== Libertarian Party ===
==== Nominee ====
- Bradley Garth Green, plumbing supply store owner and son of Cedar City mayor Garth Green

=== Constitution Party ===
==== Nominee ====
- Cassie Easley, vice chair of the Utah Constitution Party and nominee for this district in 2022

=== Independents ===
==== Declared ====
- Joseph Buchman, college professor, former chair of the Utah Libertarian Party, and perennial candidate
- Perry T. Myers

== General election ==
=== Debate ===
2023 Utah's 2nd congressional district special election debate
No.	Date	Host	Moderator	Link	Republican	Democratic
Key: P Participant A Absent N Not invited I Invited W Withdrawn						
Key: P Participant A Absent N Not invited I Invited W Withdrawn					Celeste Maloy	Kathleen Riebe
1	Oct. 26, 2023	KUED; Utah Debate Commission	Mary Weaver	YouTube	P	P

=== Predictions ===
Source	Ranking	As of
The Cook Political Report	Safe R	July 18, 2023
Inside Elections	Solid R	June 7, 2023
DDHQ	Safe R	September 4, 2023

=== Polling ===
Poll source	Date(s) administered	Sample size	Margin of error	Celeste Malloy (R)	Kathleen Riebe (D)	Brad Green (L)	Other	Undecided
Lighthouse Research	September 26 – October 6, 2023	528 (RV)	± 4.3%	43%	34%	6%	8% (Note: Joe Buchanan (Ind.) and January Walker (UU) with <3%, and Cassie Easley (C) and Perry Myers (Ind.) with <2%)	9%

=== Results ===
2023 Utah's 2nd congressional district special election
Party	Candidate	Votes	%	±%
Republican	Celeste Maloy	89,866	57.07	−2.64
Democratic	Kathleen Riebe	52,949	33.62	−0.39
Libertarian	Bradley Green	4,528	2.88	N/A
Constitution	Cassie Easley	3,678	2.34	−0.62
United Utah	January Walker	2,856	1.81	−1.51
Independent	Perry Myers	2,276	1.45	N/A
Independent	Joseph Buchman	1,281	0.81	N/A
Write-in		39	0.02	N/A
Total votes		157,473	100.00	
Republican hold				

By county

County	Celeste Maloy Republican		Kathleen Riebe Democratic		Bradley Green Libertarian		Cassie Easley Constitution		January Walker United Utah		Perry Myers Independent		Joseph Buchman Independent		Margin		Total votes
County	#	%	#	%	#	%	#	%	#	%	#	%	#	%	#	%	Total votes
Beaver	1,428	85.56%	147	8.81%	31	1.86%	26	1.56%	9	0.54%	17	1.02%	10	0.60%	1,281	76.80%	1,668
Davis	17,221	61.10%	8,090	28.70%	512	1.82%	507	1.80%	602	2.14%	287	1.02%	240	0.85%	9,131	33.25%	27,459
Garfield	1,189	77.71%	244	15.95%	24	1.57%	27	1.76%	9	0.59%	25	1.63%	8	0.52%	945	61.93%	1,526
Iron	9,308	73.29%	1,760	13.86%	801	6.31%	410	3.23%	181	1.43%	95	0.75%	95	0.75%	7,548	59.67%	12,650
Juab	104	58.43%	47	26.40%	5	2.81%	9	5.06%	1	0.56%	10	5.62%	1	0.56%	57	32.20%	177
Kane	1,475	68.99%	500	23.39%	41	1.92%	42	1.96%	9	0.42%	58	2.71%	9	0.42%	975	45.69%	2,134
Millard	2,939	83.95%	277	7.91%	81	2.31%	92	2.63%	31	0.89%	54	1.54%	14	0.40%	2,662	76.32%	3,488
Piute	553	89.92%	38	6.18%	5	0.81%	11	1.79%	3	0.49%	4	0.65%	1	0.16%	515	83.74%	615
Salt Lake	12,239	26.86%	30,222	66.33%	880	1.93%	467	1.03%	1,060	2.33%	296	0.65%	394	0.86%	−17,983	−39.47%	45,558
Sevier	4,061	83.96%	424	8.77%	98	2.03%	123	2.54%	44	0.91%	38	0.79%	34	0.70%	3,637	75.43%	4,822
Tooele	6,844	59.14%	2,628	22.71%	418	3.61%	356	3.08%	365	3.15%	737	6.37%	189	1.63%	4,216	36.54%	11,537
Washington	31,866	70.98%	8,369	18.64%	1,620	3.61%	1,594	3.55%	537	1.20%	629	1.40%	281	0.63%	23,497	52.34%	44,896
Wayne	639	70.45%	203	22.38%	12	1.32%	14	1.54%	5	0.55%	26	2.87%	5	0.55%	436	48.23%	904
Total	89,866	57.07%	52,949	33.62%	4,528	2.88%	3,678	2.34%	2,856	1.81%	2,276	1.45%	1,281	0.81%	36,917	23.45%	157,434

== See also ==
- 2023 United States House of Representatives elections
- List of special elections to the United States House of Representatives
