= Becky Edwards (Utah politician) =

American politician

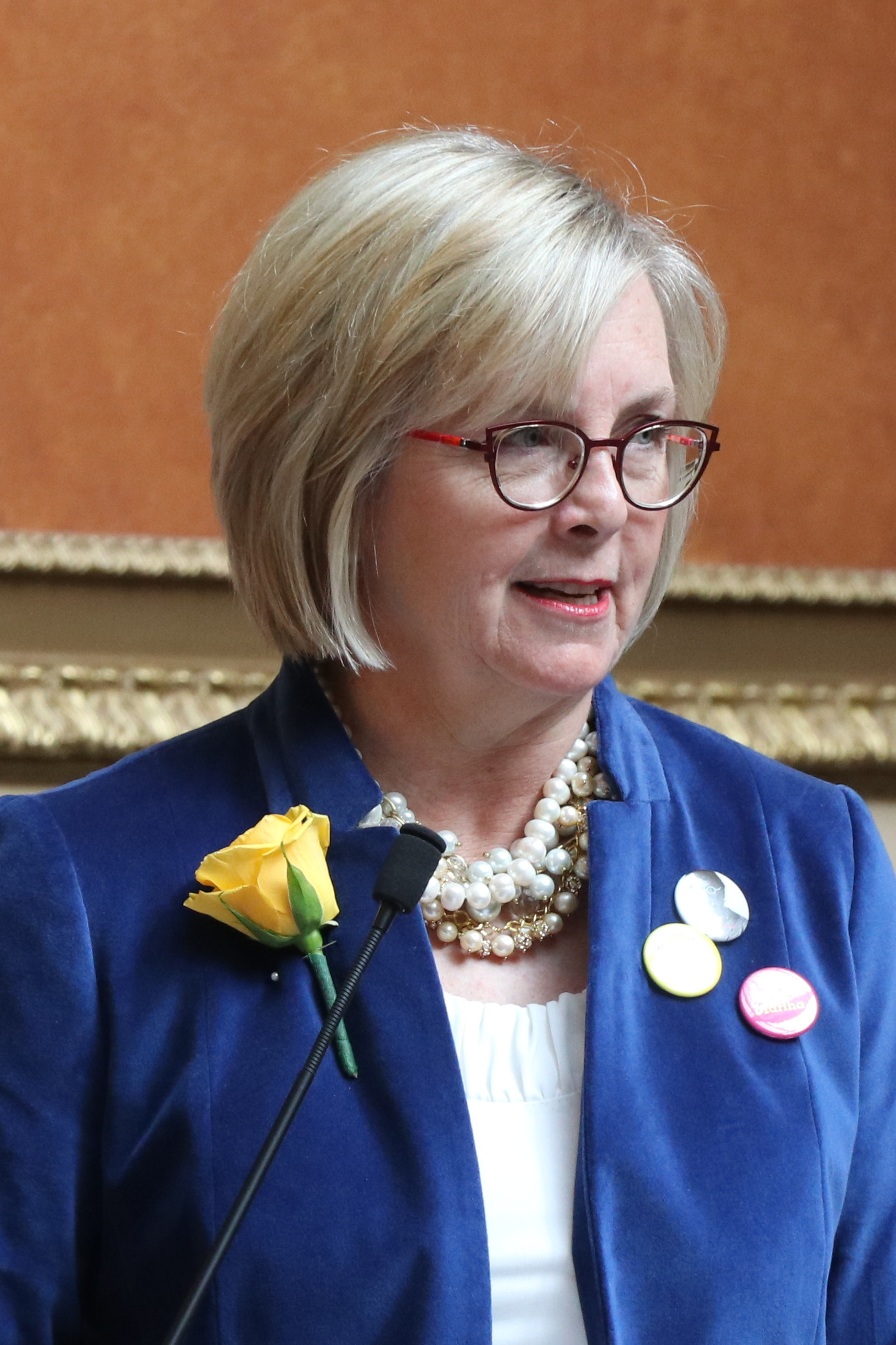
- Edwards in 2018

Member of the Utah House of Representatives from the 20th district
- In office January 2009 – January 2019
- Preceded by: Paul Neuenschwander
- Succeeded by: Melissa Garff Ballard

Personal details
- Party: Republican
- Education: Brigham Young University (BS, MSW, MS)
- Website: Campaign website

Rebecca P. Edwards is politician and therapist who served as a member of the Utah House of Representatives from 2009 to 2018. Edwards was a candidate for the 2022 United States Senate election in Utah, challenging incumbent Senator Mike Lee in the Republican primary. On May 31, 2023, Edwards announced her candidacy in the 2023 Utah 2nd congressional district special election to replace U.S. representative Chris Stewart. Edwards went on to narrowly lose the September 5th Republican primary to Celeste Maloy, a former staffer for Stewart.

== Early life ==
Edwards earned her Bachelor of Science, Master of Social Work with a focus on marriage and family therapy, and Master of Science degrees from Brigham Young University.

== Career ==
Before entering politics, Edwards worked as a marriage and family therapist and social worker.

=== Utah House of Representatives ===
In 2008, Edwards challenged District 20 incumbent Republican Representative Paul Neuenschwander in the June 24, 2008 Republican primary and won with 1,413 votes (52.1%) and won the three-way November 4, 2008 general election with 8,866 votes (65.9%) against Democratic nominee Kyle Roberts and Constitution candidate Robert Moultrie, who had run for the seat in 2006.

In 2010, Edwards had two challengers and was selected by the Republican convention as one of two candidates for the June 22, 2010 Republican primary, which she won with 2,043 votes (58%) and won the three-way November 2, 2010 general election with 6,531 votes against Democratic nominee William Ward and returning 2008 Constitution candidate Robert Moultrie.

In 2012, Edwards was selected over a challenger by the Republican convention and won the November 6, 2012 general election with 10,807 votes (75.8%) against Democratic candidate Daniel Donahoe.

Edwards was unopposed at the Republican convention in the 2014 election cycle. She faced Democratic Party nominee Robert G. Moultrie and Constitution Party nominee Donna Taylor. Edwards won the general election with 5,257 votes (71%).

During the 2016 legislative session, Edwards served on the Public Education Appropriations Subcommittee, the House Economic Development and Workforce Services Committee as well as the House Public Utilities, Energy, and Technology Committee. During the 2016 session, as Medicaid expansion was being debated, Edwards characterized the expansion approved by lawmakers as "leaving women out of the equation." She also called for a general "change [to] the culture of politics" regarding women's participation in elected office.

In the 2018 session, Edwards was the primary sponsor of HCR 7, a resolution by which Utah officially "recognized the existence of a changing climate, factors that contribute to these changes, and the potential negative effects on the state of Utah." HCR 7 notes that Utah's economy or its "global competitiveness" should not be constrained by efforts to mitigate or prepare for the effects of climate change. With HCR 7, Utah became the only state with a Republican-led legislature to officially recognize climate change.

Edwards chose not to run for re-election to her seat in 2018.

Edwards maintained a public blog throughout her tenure in the Legislature. In it, she variously discussed upcoming bills, her work on committees, constituent interactions, and day-to-day business on the Hill. Every week during her ten legislative sessions, she invited constituents to her home for discussions.

==== Committee assignments ====
Committee	Legislative Session(s)
Education	2009–2010, 2011-2012
Political Subdivisions (vice-chair)	2009–2010, 2011–2012
Economic Development and Workforce Services, Chair	2013-2014, 2015-2016
Public Utilities and Technology	2015-2016
Law Enforcement and Criminal Justice	2017-2018

==== Sponsored legislation ====
Bill number	Bill title	Bill status
HB0246	System of Care Development	Passed, signed by Governor
HB0416	Targeted Business Income Tax Credit Revisions	Passed, signed by Governor
SB0226	Permanent Criminal Stalking Injunction Amendments	Passed, signed by Governor
HB0345	Telehealth Pilot Project	Passed, signed by Governor
HB0211	State Work of Art	Passed, signed by Governor
SB0100	Early Childhood Services Coordination Amendments	Passed, signed by Governor
HCR004	Concurrent Resolution on Economic and Environmental Stewardship	Not passed
HB0352	Music Therapy Certificate Designation Amendments	Not passed
HB0350	Workforce Development Programs Reporting Requirements	Not passed
HB0278	Paid Family and Medical Leave Tax Credit	Not passed
HB0283	Workplace Protection Amendments	Not passed
HB0438	Child Custody Amendments	Not passed
HB0418	Child and Family Services Amendments	Not passed
HR0006	House Resolution Encouraging Expanded Family Leave Benefits and Quality, Affordable Child Care	Not passed
HB0368	Autism License Plate Amendments	Passed, signed by Governor
HHJR020	Joint Resolution Submitting a Question to Voters	Passed, signed by Governor
HB0348	Secondhand Merchandise Dealers Amendments	Passed, signed by Governor
HSB0074	Voter Privacy Amendments	Passed, signed by Governor
UT HCR007	Concurrent Resolution on Environmental and Economic Stewardship	Passed, signed by Governor
UT HB0444	Martha Hughes Cannon Statue Oversight Committee	Passed, signed by Governor
SB0054	Marriage and Premarital Counseling and Education Amendments	Passed, signed by Governor
SCR001	Concurrent Resolution Recommending Replacement of Statue of Philo Farnsworth in United States Capitol	Passed, signed by Governor
SB0131	Talent Ready Utah Amendments	Passed, signed by Governor

(Per the original source, this list may not be comprehensive.)

=== 2022 Senate race ===
On May 27, 2021, Edwards announced her candidacy for the 2022 United States Senate election in Utah, challenging incumbent Mike Lee. In her announcement she positioned herself as more of a centrist option than Lee, who is known for being one of the most conservative lawmakers in the Senate, saying: "Utah is tired of the division and political bickering that have become a constant in Washington, D.C. It's time for action." On July 15, 2021, she announced she had raised $466,000 in her first quarter of fundraising, including a maximum allowable contribution from the head coach of the Kansas City Chiefs, Andy Reid.

She came in second place in the Republican primary on June 28, 2022.

=== 2023 Special House race ===
On May 31, 2023, Edwards announced her candidacy in the 2023 Utah 2nd congressional district special election to replace U.S. representative Chris Stewart. She received 33% of the vote, losing to Celeste Maloy (39%), then Stewart’s chief legal counsel.

=== Utah Debate Commission ===
Edwards is a co-chair of the Utah Debate Commission along with former Utah State Senator Edgar Allen.

=== Governing Group ===
In December 2023, Edwards announced the launch of Governing Group, a Utah-based Political Action Committee created to provide support to Republican and nonpartisan candidates with a proven record of nonpartisan advocacy and policymaking. Governing Group's board and senior leadership includes former Utah Governor Gary Herbert, former US Congresswoman Mia Love, and other representatives from Utah's business, education, and legal communities. In their first cycle, Governing Group-endorsed candidates won 25 out of 28 possible General Election races.

== Personal life ==
Edwards lives in North Salt Lake, Utah, with her husband John, son of former BYU football Coach LaVell Edwards. She serves as a board member on the Days of '47 committee and volunteers at Salt Lake City Head Start. She has nine grandchildren. Edwards and her husband served as humanitarian missionaries with the Church of Jesus Christ of Latter-day Saints in American Samoa.
