= Shireen Ghorbani =

American politician

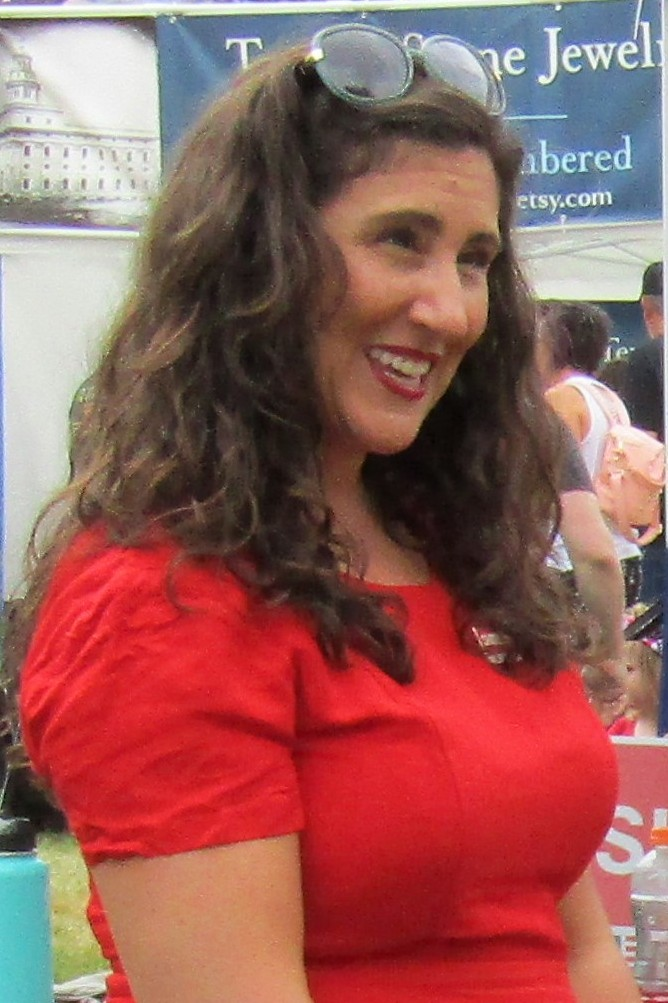

Member of the Salt Lake County Council from the at-large district
- In office February 2019 – January 2021
- Preceded by: Jenny Wilson
- Succeeded by: Laurie Stringham

Personal details
- Born: June 7, 1981 (age 44) North Dakota, U.S.
- Party: Democratic
- Education: St. Cloud State University (BA); University of Nebraska, Lincoln (MA); University of Utah (MA)

Shireen Ghorbani (Persian: شیرین قربانی; born June 7, 1981) is an American politician from Utah. She was an at-large member of the Salt Lake County Council, representing 1.1 million residents. She was selected to fill the vacancy created when Jenny Wilson became Salt Lake County Mayor. She was not re-elected during the 2020 election, losing the seat by 1,196 votes to Republican opponent Laurie Stringham. Stringham replaced Ghorbani on the council in January 2021. Ghorbani also ran unsuccessfully to represent Utah 2nd congressional district in 2018 against Chris Stewart.

== Early life and education ==
Ghorbani was born and raised in North Dakota. She was raised by a single mother; her father was from Iran.

Ghorbani did her undergraduate work at St. Cloud University in Minnesota, and got a master's degree from the University of Nebraska. Then she moved to Utah in 2009 to earn a second graduate degree at the University of Utah. She worked there as a communications professional until assuming her role as a Salt Lake Councilwoman.

== Political career ==
=== 2018 US House of Representatives election ===
Ghorbani ran for U. S. Congress in the 2018 election against Representative Chris Stewart, who represents Utah's 2nd district. Ghorbani stated that she decided to run because of the debate on health care, and specifically Stewart's repeatedly voting against Obamacare. Her mother had died from pancreatic cancer just days after being diagnosed. Ghorbani was featured on the January 29 cover of TIME magazine, together with 47 other women who were running for office.

Ghorbani focused on affordable healthcare during her campaign. She also opposed the Trump tax cut (Tax Cuts and Jobs Act of 2017), called for bipartisan cooperation, and argued for immigration reform. She says she tried to run a campaign that was "intentionally" positive. She did an Ask Me Anything on Reddit

Ghorbani received campaign donations from over 2200 individuals, and did not accept donations from corporate PAC donors. As of April 2018, Stewart had six times the cash on hand as Ghorbani.

Ghorbani lost to Stewart with 105,051 votes to Stewart's 151,489. After her concession speech, Stewart called her "a great opponent."

=== 2018 Salt Lake County elections ===
After her loss to Stewart, Ghorbani ran for Salt Lake County Mayor, after an opening was created when Ben McAdams was elected to the U. S. Congress. She lost that election to Jenny Wilson.

Ghorbani then ran again, this time in the race to fill Jenny Wilson's vacant At Large A seat on the Salt Lake County Council. She expressed a vision of improving mass transit, reforming the criminal justice system and becoming a renewable energy leader. The Salt Lake County Democratic Party Central Committee chose Ghorbani to fill the seat.

=== Salt Lake County Council ===
Ghorbani introduced and supported a resolution to transition Salt Lake County to 100% renewable energy by 2030. The measure was successful. The measure only applies to unincorporated Salt Lake County, not in incorporated cities.
