= Malden Catholic High School =

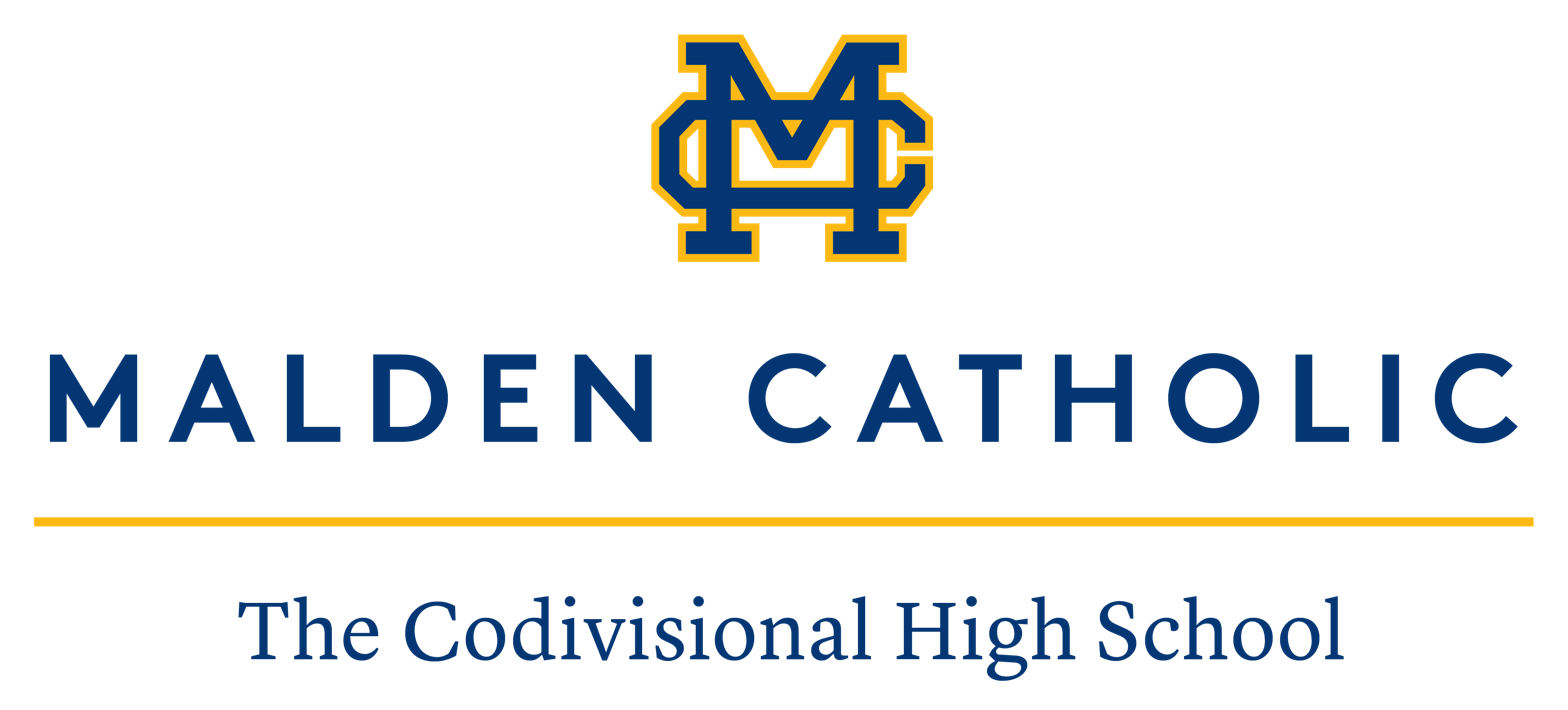

Location
- 99 Crystal Street; Malden, Massachusetts; United States; 42°25′37″N 71°02′49″W

Information
- Type: Private
- Motto: Plus Ultra (More Beyond)
- Religious affiliation: Roman Catholic
- Established: 1932
- Headmaster: John Thornburg
- Grades: 7–12
- Campus type: Urban
- Colors: Blue and Gold
- Nickname: Lancers
- Accreditation: NEASC
- Newspaper: Crystal 99
- Yearbook: The Lance
- Tuition: $18,800 (2023-2024)
- Affiliation: Xaverian Brothers Sponsored Schools
- Website: www.maldencatholic.org

Malden Catholic High School is a private, Catholic secondary school located in Malden, Massachusetts. The school was founded by the Congregation of the Brothers of St. Francis Xavier, an international congregation of religious brothers. It is a member of the Xaverian Brothers Sponsored Schools and the National Catholic Educational Association.

== History ==
=== Highland Ave. (1932–1968) ===
In 1932, work began on the "Boys' Catholic High School" on Highland Avenue in Malden, near the Immaculate Conception School. The project was established by Richard Neagle, pastor of the Immaculate Conception Parish in Malden, Massachusetts. The school opened in 1936, with Brother Gilbert as headmaster. The school educated boys from Malden and greater Boston cities and towns such as Somerville, Medford, Melrose, Charlestown and Everett. The school competed in football (playing home games at Brother Gilbert Stadium), hockey and other sports.

The school closed in 1968, having had seven headmasters. After 1968 the building became a junior high school for the Immaculate Conception School. The lab classrooms were used by Girls Catholic High School, (the sister school to Boys' Catholic) until 1992, when that school closed. While both schools were open, because of their close proximity, and conservative administration, the boys were released from school earlier than the girls so they would not converge in the neighborhood at the same time. Immaculate Conception School closed its doors in 2006 after 125 years.

=== Crystal St. (since 1968) ===
After the school closed, Richard Cardinal Cushing, Archbishop of Boston, requested that it be re-established. The Xaverian Brothers created a much larger, more regional high school on Crystal Street. The new two-story building included 30 classrooms, an auditorium, and a gymnasium. The Archdiocese provided the funds to build the new complex, originally as a loan, but later made a gift by Cardinal Cushing.

In January 1999, U.S. News & World Report profiled the school in its examination of 96 "Outstanding American High Schools". The school's first lay headmaster, Thomas Arria Jr., took over in 2005.

In the early 21st century renovation was started on the Crystal Street complex, and a new sports field and cafeteria completed.

== Athletics ==
Malden Catholic is a member of the Massachusetts Interscholastic Athletic Association (MIAA). It is a member of the Catholic Conference, a six-school athletics league, alongside competitors St. John's Preparatory School, Boston College High School, Xaverian Brothers High School, Catholic Memorial, and St. John's. The school colors are blue and gold, and the team mascot is the Lancer.

=== Stadium ===
Malden Catholic's main athletic facility was opened in 1988 as Brother Gilbert Stadium and was set with natural grass. The stadium was constructed so that Malden Catholic teams would no longer have to use the public Roosevelt Park, down the street and off campus. It was found that the stadium could not grow grass well and, after a decade or so, it needed heavy repairs.

Following the 2002 football season, the school received a $1,000,000 donation from longtime supporter James Donovan to help offset the costs of completely renovating the stadium. The natural grass in the field was replaced with FieldTurf, and a new track and lighting system was added. In 2004 the field was reopened as Donovan Field at Brother Gilbert Stadium, with the new track reopened as Brother Myles MacManus Track. The field was named in memory of Donovan's father, James R. Donovan, a Malden Catholic alumnus who later worked as a custodian at the school.

== Notable alumni ==
- Jonathan Cheever, professional snowboarder
- Joe Coleman, former Major League Baseball player
- Gerard F. Doherty, former Chair of the Massachusetts Democratic Party and a campaign manager for Robert F. Kennedy
- Eugene Fama, 2013 Nobel Laureate in Economics
- Mike Fidler, former National Hockey League player
- Ryan Fitzgerald (ice hockey), professional ice hockey player
- Jack Hughes, former National Hockey League player
- Ed Markey, United States senator
- Colin McManus, professional ice dancer
- James Perry, football coach
- John Pinette, comedian
- Francis Ricciardone, United States Ambassador to Turkey
- Dana Rosenblatt, former professional boxer
- Chris Snow, former professional sportswriter and National Hockey League executive
- Keith Tkachuk, former National Hockey League player
- Jeffrey Turco, attorney and member of the Massachusetts House of Representatives
- Luke Verge, winner of MTV's Bromance
- Mike Vecchione, National Hockey League player

== See also ==
- List of high schools in Massachusetts
