= Norm Thurston =

American politician

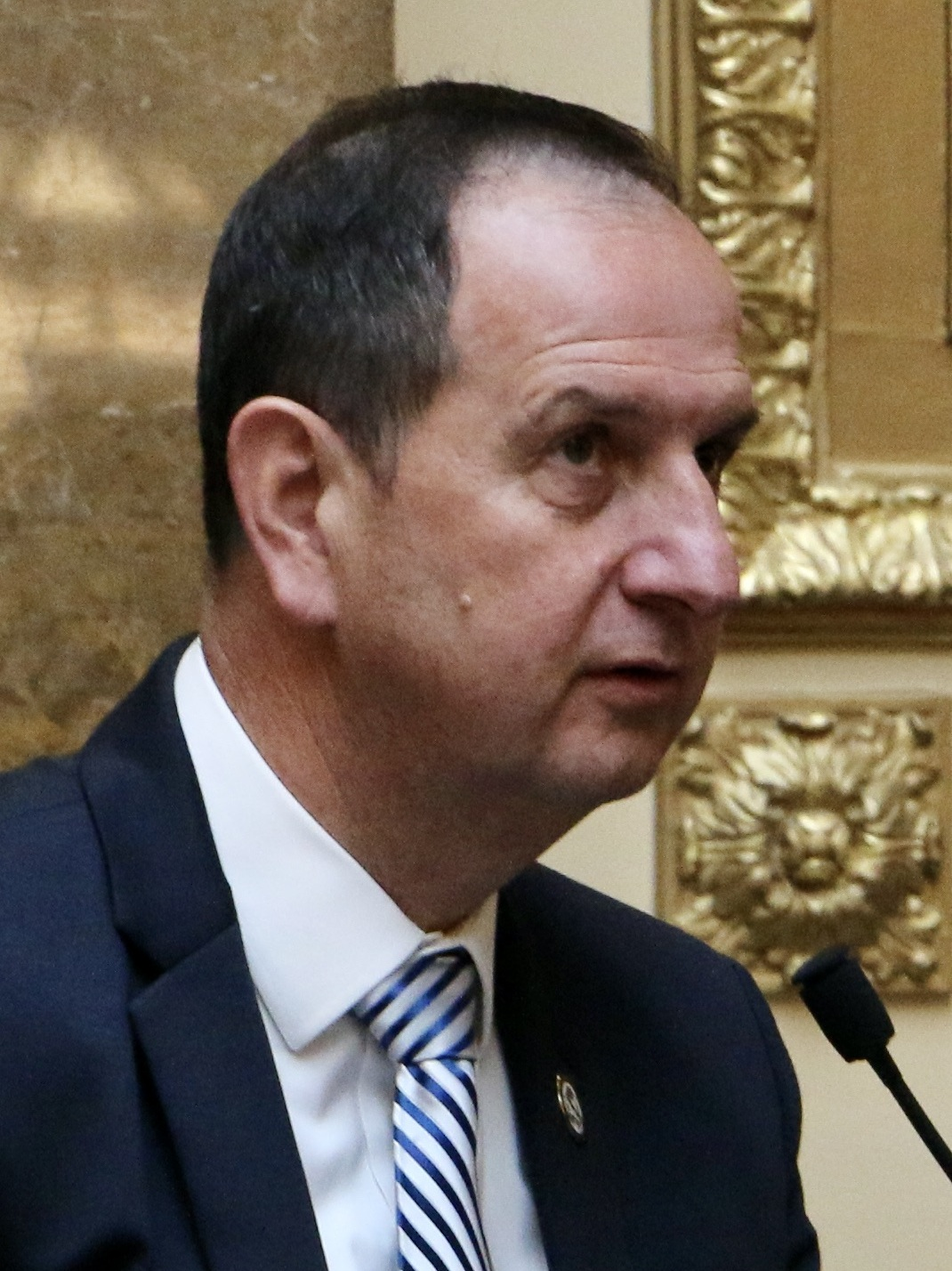

Member of the Utah House of Representatives
- Incumbent
- Assumed office January 1, 2015
- Preceded by: Rebecca Lockhart
- Succeeded by: David Chappell (elect)
- Constituency: 64th district (2015–2023); 62nd district (2023–present)

Personal details
- Born: Ogden, Utah
- Party: Republican
- Education: Brigham Young University; Princeton University
- Profession: Economist

Norm Thurston (born October 4 in Ogden, Utah) is an American politician and a Republican member of the Utah House of Representatives representing District 62.

== Biography ==
Thurston received a BA in Spanish and Agricultural Economic Analysis from Brigham Young University. He then went on to Princeton University where he received both an MS and PhD in economics. Thurston resides in Provo, Utah with his wife Maria. Together they have three children and three grandchildren. He is currently the Director for the Office of Health Care Statistics which is the agency responsible for collecting, analyzing, and disseminating information about health care cost and quality for the State of Utah.

== Political career and elections ==
During the 2020 election of district 64, Thurston won with 100% of the vote as all other challengers withdrew. In a previous election, Thurston defeated William Snider, Ben Summerhalder and Karen Ellingson in the Republican convention and won the November 4, 2014 General election against Democratic nominee Scott Ellis Ferrin and Independent American nominee Jason Christensen with 2,635 votes (67.8%).

During the 2022 General Session, Thurston served on the Social Services Appropriations Subcommittee, House Business and Labor Committee, House Government Operations Committee, Administrative Rules Review Committee, and the Occupational and Professional Licensure Review Committee.

In the 2026 midterms, Thurston lost his bid for re-election in house district 62 to democratic challenger David Chappell with 45% of the vote.

== 2022 sponsored legislation ==
Bill number	Bill title	Status
HB 176	Utah Health Workforce Act	House/ to Governor – 3/4/2022
HB 198	Intergenerational Poverty Solution	House/ filed – 3/4/22
HB 217	Telephone Solicitation Amendments	House/ to Governor – 3/4/2022
HB 283	Mental Health Professional Licensing Amendments	House/ to Governor – 3/4/2022
HB 368	Vehicle License Plate and Registration Amendments	House/ filed 3/4/22
