= Greg Curtis =

American politician (born 1960)

Greg J. Curtis

Speaker of the Utah House of Representatives
- In office 2005–2009
- Preceded by: Martin Stephens
- Succeeded by: David Clark

Member of the Utah House of Representatives from the 49th district
- In office 1995–2009
- Preceded by: Russell Cannon
- Succeeded by: Jay Seegmiller

Personal details
- Born: October 18, 1960 (age 65)
- Spouse: Teresa
- Education: Brigham Young University; S.J. Quinney College of Law
- Occupation: Lobbyist; Attorney

Greg J. Curtis (born October 18, 1960) is an American lobbyist and attorney from Utah. A Republican, he is a former member of the Utah State House of Representatives.

== Early life and career ==
Curtis grew up in his district in Sandy and served a two-year LDS mission to New Zealand. He has worked for a private law firm; as a prosecutor for West Jordan City; and as staff counsel for County Mayor Nancy Workman. Curtis graduated from Brigham Young University with a degree in accounting and then received a J.D. degree from the S.J. Quinney College of Law at the University of Utah. He is married to Teresa Curtis and the father of six children and eight grandchildren.

== Utah House of Representatives ==
Curtis was first elected to the State Legislature in 1994, defeating Republican incumbent Russell Cannon in the primary. He represented the 49th house district centered around Sandy and Cottonwood Heights. In 2005, he succeeded Martin Stephens as Speaker of the Utah House of Representatives.

=== Allegations of corruption ===
Beginning in October 2008, Curtis was plagued by accusations from several former state employees who claimed that Curtis abused his government position to benefit his legal clients financially. One of these former employees, Doug Clark, claimed that Curtis cut funding and caused layoffs to anyone who opposed his plans to build a public transit facility in the midst of an ancient Native American settlement in Draper, Utah. Changing the location of the proposed facility would have kept land owners in the area from moving forward with subsequent development plans. Clark said that Curtis told him, *“Doug, I am the speaker of the House. If I want something, I get it. ... I want you to talk to DNR to figure out a way to get that road through there. I know this may sound a little strange. You may think it is unethical — because it probably is — because effectively I’m asking you as a state employee to work for me and do work for my law client.”

On November 4, 2008, Curtis became the first sitting Speaker of the House in Utah to fail to win re-election in 40 years. Democrat Jay Seegmiller won by over 10% - nearly 1,400 votes.

== Lobbying career ==
For the 2009 legislative session, Curtis returned to Utah's Capitol Hill - not as a state representative - but as a lobbyist representing several large companies, including Intermountain Healthcare, UTA, Altria Group, parent company of Philip Morris.
