= Richard Davis (political scientist) =

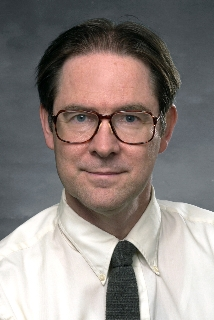

Academic background
- Education: Brigham Young University; Syracuse University

Academic work
- Institutions: Brigham Young University

Richard Davis is an American professor and author. He is a professor emeritus at Brigham Young University. He is the author of several books and articles in American politics, including Web of Politics, Electing Justice, Supreme Democracy, and Campaigning Online.

== Biography ==
Davis graduated from Brigham Young University with a B.A. in political science and then completed a Master's in Mass Communication from BYU as well. He went on to Syracuse University where he earned another Master's and his Ph.D., both in political science.

He was the founding director of the Office of Civic Engagement Leadership at Brigham Young University. He co-founded the Civic Engagement Section of the American Political Science Association. He also was a co-founder of the Utah Debate Commission. He also co-founded the United Utah Party, a centrist state party in Utah. Prior to founding, he was a chairman of the Utah County Democratic Party.

== Works ==
- Beyond the Ivory Tower: The Case for Civically Engaged Political Scientists (Lawrence, KS: University Press of Kansas, 2023)
- Electoral Campaigns, Media, and the New World of Digital Politics (Ann Arbor, MI: University of Michigan Press, 2022) Edited volume with David Taras
- Beyond Donkeys and Elephants: Minor Political Parties in Contemporary American Politics, (Lawrence, KS: University of Kansas Press, 2020) Edited Volume
- Power Shift? Political Leadership and Social Media (New York: Routledge, 2020) Edited volume with David Taras
- Supreme Democracy: The End of Elitism in Supreme Court Nominations (New York: Oxford University Press, 2017)
- Justices and Journalists: The Global Perspective (New York: Cambridge University Press, 2017) Edited volume with David Taras
- Twitter and Elections around the World (New York: Routledge, 2017) Edited volume with Christina Holtz-Bacha and Marion Just.
- Covering the Court in the Digital Age (New York: Cambridge University Press, 2014) Edited volume.
- Justices and Journalists (New York: Cambridge University Press, 2011)
- Typing Politics (New York: Oxford University Press, 2009)
- Making a Difference: A Comparative View of the Role of the Internet in Election Politics (Lanham, MD: Lexington Books, 2008) Edited volume with Diana Owen, Stephen Ward, and David Taras
- Electing Justice (New York: Oxford University Press, 2005)
- Campaigning Online (New York: Oxford University Press, 2003) With Bruce Bimber
- The Press and American Politics: The New Mediator (Englewood Cliffs, NJ: Prentice-Hall, 2000)
- The Web of Politics(New York: Oxford University Press, 1999)
- New Media and American Politics (New York: Oxford University Press, 1998) With Diana Owen
- Decisions and Images (Englewood Cliffs, NJ: Prentice-Hall, 1994)
- Politics and the Media (Englewood Cliffs, NJ: Prentice-Hall, 1994) Edited Volume

Trade Books

- Faith and Politics: Latter-day Saint Politicians Tell Their Stories, (Salt Lake City, UT: Deseret Book, 2024)
- Spiritual Gems from the Imitation of Christ, (Totowa, NJ: Catholic Book Publishing, 2016)
- The Liberal Soul: Applying the Gospel of Jesus Christ to Politics (Sandy, UT: Greg Kofford Books, 2014)
- Fathers and Sons: Lessons from the Scriptures (Springville, UT: Cedar Fort Publishing, 2005)
