= Kathleen Riebe =

American politician in Utah

Member of the Utah Senate
- Incumbent
- Assumed office January 1, 2019
- Preceded by: Brian Zehnder
- Constituency: 8th district (2019–2023); 15th district (2023–present)

Personal details
- Born: Long Island, New York, U.S.
- Party: Democratic
- Education: Hofstra University (BA); Utah State University (MA)

Kathleen Riebe (/ˈriːbiː/ REE-bee) is an American politician from Salt Lake City, Utah. She was a member of the Utah State Board of Education through 2018, and now represents Utah's 15th senate district in the Utah State Senate. Prior to redistricting she represented the 8th district. On May 31, 2023, she announced to KSL News Radio that she was running in the 2023 Utah's 2nd congressional district special election. She was nominated by the Utah Democratic Party to be their candidate in the general election. In November 2025, she announced her candidacy for U. S. Congress in the 2026 elections.

== Education and career ==
Riebe was born in Long Island, New York. She graduated from Hofstra University in 1991 with a double major in Elementary Education and Sociology. She has worked as a truck driver, bartender, and an Alta police dispatcher and has taught outdoor education in New York, Georgia, New Jersey, and Maine. Riebe has taught in the Granite School District since 2001, where she is currently employed as an educational technology specialist. She got a Master's and an Administrative Certificate in 2006 from Utah State University. She has an Educational Technology Endorsement from Southern Utah University. She has 2 children.

== Political career ==
In 2016, Riebe was elected to the Utah State Board of Education, defeating anti-common-core candidate Gary Thompson. While on the State school board, she served on the board's Financial Literacy Committee; School and Institutional Trust Lands Administration (STILA) Nominating Committee; Science, Technology, Engineering, and Mathematics (STEM) Action Center; Underage Drinking Committee; and served as co-chair of the Finance Committee. She took part in settlement negotiations when the Utah School Board was sued over the Professional Practices Advisory Commission, or UPPAC, for recommending harsher-than-necessary and often inconsistent discipline.

Riebe secured the Democratic nomination for Utah Senate District 8 by defeating former candidate for U. S. Congress Kathie Allen at the Salt Lake County Democratic Convention on April 14, 2018, with 65% of the vote.

On November 6, 2018, Riebe won the 2018 election for Utah Senate District 8, defeating incumbent Republican Brian Zehnder with 56% of the vote. Having been elected to the State Senate, she had to resign her State School Board seat mid-term. Riebe sits on the Senate Education and Transportation Committees.

After redistricting in 2022, Senator Riebe's district changed to the 15th District. She was elected Minority Whip in January 2023.

== Election history ==
=== 2024 ===
Utah State Senate District 15, general election
Party	Candidate	Votes	%
Democratic	Kathleen Riebe	27,103	57.0%
Republican	Scott Cuthbertson	20,414	43.0%
Total votes		47,517	100%

=== 2023 ===
2023 Utah's 2nd congressional district, special election
Party	Candidate	Votes	%
Republican	Celeste Maloy	89,866	56.8%
Democratic	Kathleen Riebe	53,949	33.5%
Libertarian	Brad Green	4,528	2.9
Constitution	Cassie Easley	3,678	2.3
United Utah	January Walker	2,858	1.8%
Independent	Perry Myers, Joseph Buchman	3,557	2.26%
Write-in	690	0.4%	
Total votes		158,124	100%

=== 2020 ===
Utah State Senate District 8, general election
Party	Candidate	Votes	%
Democratic	Kathleen Riebe	28,811	56.6%
Republican	Brian Zehnder	22,078	43.4
Total votes		50,889	100%

=== 2018 ===
Utah State Senate District 8, general election
Party	Candidate	Votes	%
Democratic	Kathleen Riebe	23,221	55.8%
Republican	Brian Zehnder	17,328	41.7%
United Utah	John Jackson	1,053	2.5%
Total votes		41,602	100%
