= Rebecca D. Lockhart =

American politician (1968–2015)

Rebecca Lockhart
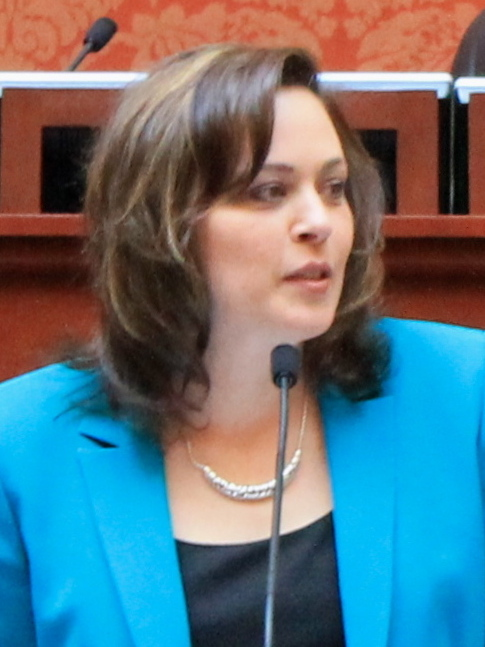

Speaker of the Utah House of Representatives
- In office January 24, 2011 – January 1, 2015
- Preceded by: David Clark
- Succeeded by: Greg Hughes

Member of the Utah House of Representatives from the 64th district
- In office January 1, 1999 – January 1, 2015
- Preceded by: Bryon Lee Harward
- Succeeded by: Norm Thurston

Personal details
- Born: November 20, 1968 Reno, Nevada, U.S.
- Died: January 17, 2015 (aged 46) Provo, Utah, U.S.
- Party: Republican
- Education: Brigham Young University

Rebecca Dawn Lockhart (November 20, 1968 – January 17, 2015) was an American politician and Republican member of the Utah House of Representatives. Lockhart represented the 64th District in Provo, Utah. Lockhart was the first female Speaker of the House in Utah, serving until the end of 2014, when she chose not to run again.

== Early life and career ==
Lockhart was born in Reno, Nevada and attended college at Brigham Young University where she obtained a degree in nursing.

Lockhart's husband, Stan Lockhart, served as a member of the Provo City Council and previously served as chair of the Utah Republican Party. In 2014, Stan Lockhart worked as a lobbyist for Micron/IM Flash Tech. The Lockharts lived together in Provo, Utah, where the couple raised their family.

== Political career ==
Becky Lockhart served in the Utah House of Representatives for sixteen years. She announced in 2014 that she would not be seeking reelection that year, and pundits claimed that she may have been focusing her efforts on running in the 2016 Utah gubernatorial election.

During the 2013 and 2014 legislative sessions, Lockhart served on a variety of committees, including the Executive Appropriations Committee, the House Legislative Expense Oversight Committee, the Administrative Rules Review Committee, the Legislative Management Committee, and the Legislative Audit Subcommittee. She also served on the Commission on Federalism, the Education Task Force, the Subcommittee on Oversight, and the Utah Constitutional Revision Commission.

=== 2014 sponsored legislation ===
Serving as Speaker of the House, Lockhart did not file any bills under her name. In 2014 Lockhart's primary legislative project was HB 131S03, the Public Education Modernization Act, filed under Representative Francis Gibson.

=== Pivotal legislation ===
HB 131S03, the Public Education Modernization Act, was particularly controversial. The proposed legislation called for $200–$300 million in state funds to replace textbooks with tablet computers in the state's classrooms. The bill was essentially killed in budget negotiations.

Among other projects while in the state legislature, Lockhart pushed for a radar at Provo Municipal Airport. She also proposed a revised tax system that would greatly increase the amount of taxes levied by Utah on chewing tobacco.

=== HB477 Republican leadership controversy ===
At the close of the 2011 Utah legislative session, there was open concern expressed by one representative that, under Republican Party Leadership (who had a large majority in both houses), legislators were pressured to vote for HB477, which denied the public access to certain forms of government communication. There was vast public outcry over the bill which was hurriedly presented and passed under her, and other Republican leaders' oversight.

== Death ==
Lockhart died at her home in Provo, Utah on January 17, 2015, from Creutzfeldt–Jakob disease, an extremely rare and invariably fatal brain disease. She had begun to develop signs of the condition a few weeks before her death. The illness had led to her admission to the hospital a few days after she left office.

== Tribute ==
In 2016, the Utah House of Representatives building on Capitol Hill was named the Rebecca D. Lockhart building. In 2017 the Rebecca D. Lockhart Arena at Utah Valley University was named after Lockhart.

== See also ==
- 54th Utah State Legislature
- List of female speakers of legislatures in the United States
