= Theodore Roosevelt Park =

Theodore Roosevelt Park may refer to:

- Theodore Roosevelt Island Park, Washington DC
- Theodore Roosevelt Memorial Park, Oyster Bay, New York
- Theodore Roosevelt Monument, New Jersey
- Theodore Roosevelt National Park, North Dakota
  - Theodore Roosevelt Wilderness
- Theodore Roosevelt National Wildlife Refuge Complex, Mississippi
  - Theodore Roosevelt National Wildlife Refuge
- Theodore Roosevelt Park, in the Chicago Loop neighborhood of Chicago, Illinois
- Theodore Roosevelt Park, Manhattan, New York City
- Theodore Roosevelt State Park, Pennsylvania
- Montauk County Park, New York, formerly known as Theodore Roosevelt County Park

== See also ==
- Roosevelt Park (disambiguation)
- Theodore Roosevelt State Natural Area, North Carolina
- Theodore Roosevelt (disambiguation)
