= Charles Hays Secondary School =

Charles Hays Secondary

Location
- 201 Prince Rupert Blvd. Prince Rupert, British Columbia, V8J 4N7; Canada; 54.31125°N 130.30388°W

Information
- School type: Public, high school
- School board: School District 52 Prince Rupert
- Principal: Carla Rourke
- Grades: 9–12
- Colours: Green, blue
- Mascot: Hurricane Charlie
- Team name: RainMakers
- Website: chss.rupertschools.ca

Charles Hays Secondary School (CHSS) is a public secondary school located in Prince Rupert, British Columbia, Canada. The school serves a student population of approximately 700 students in grades 9 to 12. Besides scholastic programs, CHSS offers extracurricular sports and opportunities for students to become involved with their community.

The school was opened in 1992 at its present location, replacing the antiquated Booth Memorial Junior Secondary School. The school is named after Charles Melville Hays, president of the Grand Trunk Railway and founder of Prince Rupert. The railway was the primary reason for the founding of Prince Rupert.

The school is the only high school in Prince Rupert, and it is run by School District #52, which is the public school district of the area including Prince Rupert British Columbia.

From its opening in 1992 until June 2005, the school's principal was Skip Cronck. After Cronck's retirement, vice-principal Sandra Jones took over the role until she became superintendent. Sheila Wells, the former principal of the now-closed Prince Rupert Secondary School, held the position of principal for two years until 2013, when she was succeeded by Sandy Pond, and was later succeeded by Carla Rourke.

CHSS's School District, 52, mission statement is to "Ensure each student successfully completes their educational program with a sense of hope, purpose and control."
