= Jonathan Cheever =

American snowboarder

Personal information
- Born: April 17, 1985 (age 41) Boston, Massachusetts, U.S.
- Height: 5 ft 10 in (178 cm)
- Weight: 185 lb (84 kg)
- Website: www.teamcheever.net

Sport
- Country: United States
- Sport: Snowboarding

Jonathan Cheever (born April 17, 1985) is an American professional snowboarder. He was an athlete on the U.S. Snowboarding's Snowboard Cross (SBX) A-Team. In 2011, Cheever was named the U.S. Snowboarding Champion, and took 2nd-place, twice, in the FIS World Cup at Stoneham Mountain Resort in Quebec and Chiesa in Valmalenco in Italy, becoming the second American male ever in his discipline to win the World Cup. In 2011, he was ranked third in the world in Snowboard Cross (SBX). Still no U.S. athlete has won a FIS World Cup title in SBX.

Jonathan Cheever is ranked 7th in 2017-2018 FIS World Cup standings after two races. A third-place finish at the first World Cup of the 2017-2018 season, in Cerro Catedral in Argentina, put Cheever on the podium in back to back World Cups. Cheever and teammate, Mick Dierdorf, placed 2nd at the Team Snowboard Cross (BXT) FIS World Cup in Veysonnaz, Switzerland, March 2017.

Cheever is currently represented by Sho Kashima, one of Jonathan's best friends and former U.S. Ski Team athlete.

== Personal background ==
Jonathan Cheever was born in Boston and grew up in Saugus, Massachusetts. He is the son of Mark and Dorene, and has one brother, Derek. He graduated from Malden Catholic High School, in 2003, where he additionally served as President of the Student Body, and Founder, and President of the school's Snowboard and Ski Club. Upon graduation, Cheever attended the University of Massachusetts Lowell. In 2004 Cheever became a licensed plumber. Cheever resides in Park City, UT where he owns and operates Team Cheever Design Build, a general contracting, plumbing, and design firm.

== Career ==
Jonathan Cheever started skiing when he was eight years old at Nashoba Valley, in Massachusetts. During Thanksgiving of 1997, his parents enrolled him in free snowboarding lessons at Attitash Bear Peak, in neighboring New Hampshire. Cheever jumped on a board and never looked back. He credits much of his success to the help he has received after meeting Nate Park in 2004.

In 2011, Jonathan Cheever took two second-place finishes on the World Cup. He additionally took the national title, earning him the title of top in the United States.

In 2014 Cheever produced " SBX the Movie " with Brett Saunders and Maria Ramberger. http://www.sbxthemovie.com

Much like other athletes on the U.S. Snowboard SBX Team, Cheever's competitive snowboard background comes from all disciplines. Cheever has World Cup starts in pipe and big air. He has pre-qualified 1st at US Open Slope Style and has won freestyle and free ride competitions.

== Standings ==
2004–2005

- 2nd Place in Halfpipe at New Zealand Snowboard Nationals 2004
- 2nd Place in Boardercross at New Zealand South Island Champs 2004
- 3rd Place in Halfpipe at New Zealand South Island Champs 2004
- 2nd Place in Boardercross at Eastern Regionals in 2004
- 4th Place in Halfpipe at Eastern Regionals in 2004
- 4th Place in USASA Nationals Slopestyle in 2003
- 4th Place in USASA Nationals Halfpipe in 2003
- 1st Place at USASA Nationals for Overall Freestyle in 2003
- 3rd Place at USASA Nationals Boardercross in 2001, 4th in 2002, 5th in 2003
- Ranked #1 in Maine USASA Halfpipe 01–02, 02-03
- Ranked #1 in Maine USASA SBX 01–02, 02-03, 03-04

2005–2006

- 3rd Place in NorAm Cup Standings for 2005–2006 (absent for two events)
- 4th Place in SBX at NorAm Finals/Can Nationals at Mt. Avila, Quebec, 2006
- 1st Place in SBX at USASA Nationals at Northstar 2006
- 2nd Place in SBX at NorAm Cup at Big White, British Columbia 2006
- 16th Place in SBX at X-Games 2006
- 4th Place in SBX Jabra X Jam at Sugarbowl 2005
- 5th Place in SBX at U.S. National/NorAm 2005
- Best Trick Rail Billabong Slopestyle Jam at Snowpark, New Zealand 2005
- 9th Place in Halfpipe at New Zealand Snowboard Nationals 2005
- 5th Place in Slopestyle at Western Regionals in 2005
- 5th Place in Halfpipe at Western Regionals in 2005

2006–2007

- 3rd Place NorAm Finals SBX Cypress, British Columbia 2007
- 2nd Place Suzuki Champions Cross Sugarloaf, Maine 2007
- Highest Air World Cup Quarter Pipe Competition, Lake Placid, New York 2007
- 6th Place World Cup Quarter Pipe competition, Lake Placid, New York 2007
- 7th Place in Slopestyle at Coca-Cola Cardrona Games, 2006
- 4th Place in Halfpipe at Coca-Cola Cardrona Games, 2006
- 2nd Place in SBX at Coca-Cola Cardrona Games, 2006
- 2nd Place in Quiksilver King of the Park at Snowpark, New Zealand 2006

2007–2008

- 5th Place Canadian Nationals Cypress, British Columbia 2008
- 8th Place Jeep King of the Mountain Sun Valley, Idaho 2008
- 10th Place Stoneham World Cup, Quebec 2008
- 7th Place Lake Placid World Cup Lake Placid, New York 2008
- 6th Place US Grand Prix Tamarack, Idaho 2008
- 6th Place Jeep King of the Mountain Squaw Valley 2008

2008–2009

- Finished 2008–2009 Snowboard Season Ranked 6th in the World in SBX
- Finished 2008–2009 Snowboard Season Ranked 3rd in the US in SBX
- 5th Place SBX World Cup Valmalenco, Italy 2009
- 2nd Place SBX World Cup Stoneham Quebec 2009
- 5th Place SBX World Cup Cypress, Vancouver (Olympic Venue) 2009
- 6th Place 2009 Winter X Games
- 6th Place Chapelco Argentina World Cup 2008

2009–2010 (season-ending injury)

In February 2010, Cheever fractured his right ankle, while attempting double corks, on a trampoline at the USSA Center of Excellence.

2010–2011

- 1st USASA Open Class SBX *
- 1st GNU Guts N' Glory Canyons, Utah
- 3rd in World Cup Standings for 2010-2011 Winter (Top Ranked American)
- 2nd Place SBX World Cup, Valmalenco Italy 2011
- 2nd Place SBX World Cup, Stoneham, Quebec 2011
- 2010–2011 US National SBX Champion
- 2nd Place US SBX Grand Prix Canyons, Utah 2011
- 5th Place 2011 Winter X Games Boarder X
- 2nd Place Team SBX World Cup Telluride, Colorado 2010
- 6th Place SBX World Cup Telluride, Colorado 2010
- 8th Place FIS Snowboarding World Championships 2011 – Men's snowboard cross in La Molina, Spain
