= School District 52 Prince Rupert =

School district in British Columbia, Canada

Location
- Prince Rupert North Coast Regional District Canada
- Coordinates: 54.3171931°N 130.3129924°W

District information
- Superintendent: Andrew Samoil
- Chair of the board: James Horne
- Schools: 9
- Budget: CA$24.5 million

Students and staff
- Students: 1833
- Teachers: 155.2 (on an FTE basis)

Other information
- Website: www.rupertschools.ca

School District 52 Prince Rupert is a school district in British Columbia, serving the communities of Prince Rupert, Port Edward, Metlakatla, and Hartley Bay (the Gitga’at First Nation), which are within the territory of the Ts’msyen Nation.

The school district offers a school-based Sm'álgyax language program to enhance the cultural identity and school achievement of Indigenous students. The district's office of First Nation Educational Services has gained a reputation for leading the establishment of academic credibility with respect to First Nations inclusion.

== Water ==
On January 20, 2020, Northern Health had the district discontinue the use of school drinking fountains. Accordingly, the district distributes bottled water.

== History ==
Prince Rupert is a port city on British Columbia's northwest coast. It's a gateway to wilderness areas like the Khutzeymateen Grizzly Sanctuary bear habitat. Shops and cafes dot the waterfront Cow Bay area. The Museum of Northern B.C. showcases the region's natural and cultural heritage. South, the North Pacific Cannery traces the city's salmon-canning history. Humpback whales swim in the fish-filled waters offshore. Weather: 15 °C, Wind S at 8 km/h, 75% Humidity Population: 12,508 (2011) Regional District: Skeena-Queen Charlotte

== Schools ==
School	Location	Grades
Charles Hays Secondary School	Prince Rupert	9-12
Conrad Elementary School	Prince Rupert	K-5
Hartley Bay Elem-Jr Secondary School	Hartley Bay	K-12
Pacific Coast School	Prince Rupert	9-12 (Alternate)
Lax Kxeen Elementary School	Prince Rupert	K-5
Pineridge Elementary School	Prince Rupert	K-5
Port Edward Elementary School	Port Edward	K-5
Prince Rupert Middle School	Prince Rupert	6-8
Roosevelt Park Elementary School	Prince Rupert	K-5

== See also ==
- List of school districts in British Columbia
