= David Chappell (politician) =

American politician

Member-elect of the Utah House of Representatives from the 62nd district
- Assuming office January 2027
- Succeeding: Norm Thurston

Personal details
- Born: David Russell Shill; 1998 or 1999 (age 27–28) Mesa, Arizona
- Party: Democratic (since 2026)
- Other political affiliations: Democratic Socialists of America (Note: The Democratic Socialists of America (DSA) is not a registered political party. Instead, it is a political organization for those with democratic socialist ideologies. Chappell is a member of the DSA.)
- Education: Brigham Young University (BS)
- Occupation: Engineer

David Chappell is an American politician and civil engineer. A member of the Democratic Party, he is the member-elect for the 62nd district of the Utah House of Representatives after defeating Republican incumbent Norm Thurston in the 2026 general election. He is the first Democrat to represent Utah County in the Utah State Legislature since 1996.

== Biography ==
Chappell was elected as part of a national blue wave which saw Democrats flip over a dozen seats in the state house of representatives, ending the Republican supermajority in the chamber. The local campaign was somewhat overshadowed by national backlash to the Second Trump Administration and its policies.

During the campaign, Chappell, a self-described member of the Democratic Socialists of America, advocated for proposals including free school lunches, banning corporate money in politics, and passing a workers' bill of rights and a renters bill of rights. He defeated incumbent Norm Thurston by a five-point margin in what was considered a strongly Republican district.
