= Pacific Coast School =

Location
- 2nd Ave W Prince Rupert, British Columbia; Canada
- Coordinates: 54.3137°N 130.3247°W

Information
- School type: Public, high school
- Founded: February 2009
- School board: School District 52 Prince Rupert
- Superintendent: Andrew Samoil
- Principal: Jeremy Janz
- Staff: 10
- Grades: 9–12
- Language: English
- Website: pcs.rupertschools.ca

Pacific Coast School is an alternate public secondary school located in Prince Rupert, British Columbia. The school serves students from grades 9-12. The school is run by School District 52 Prince Rupert.
