= Jay Seegmiller (politician) =

American politician (born 1958)

Member of the Utah House of Representatives from the 49th district
- In office 2009–2011
- Preceded by: Greg Curtis
- Succeeded by: Derek Brown

Personal details
- Born: May 29, 1958 (age 68) Salt Lake City, Utah
- Party: Democratic
- Spouse: Michelle Seegmiller

Jay Seegmiller (born May 29, 1958) is an American politician from Utah. He has served as a member of the Utah House of Representatives and was the Democratic Party's nominee for Utah's 2nd congressional district in the 2012 election.

== Early life, education and career ==
Seegmiller was born in Salt Lake City, Utah. He graduated from South High School and attended the University of Utah. His 2nd great-grandfather William Henry Seegmiller was Mayor of Richfield, Utah and served in the Utah Territorial Legislature as Speaker of the House. Seegmiller married his wife Michelle in 1978 and has four children and four grandchildren. He is a member of the Church of Jesus Christ of Latter-day Saints. Seegmiller worked for the Union Pacific Railroad from 1976 to 1987 as a brakeman, conductor, and yardmaster. In August 1987 Seegmiller went to work for Amtrak as a conductor.

== Utah State Legislature ==
In 2008 Seegmiller ran against and defeated Utah Speaker of the House Greg Curtis; no sitting speaker had been defeated in Utah in 40 years. Seegmiller was elected to the Utah State Legislature in 2008 and served from 2009 to 2011. During that time he served on the Transportation and the Workforce Services and Community and Economic Development Standing Committees, the Public Utilities & Natural Resource Interim Committee, and the Transportation, Environmental Quality, and National Guard Appropriations Committee.

== Congressional campaign ==
Seegmiller was one of three Democratic candidates for Utah's 2nd congressional district in the 2012 election. He defeated Dean Collinwood and Mike Small outright at the convention, proceeding to the general election without a primary. The 2nd district was held by Democratic Congressman Jim Matheson, who opted to run in the newly created 4th congressional district, and is now held by Chris Stewart, who defeated Seegmiller.
