= Roosevelt Park (San Antonio) =

Public park in San Antonio, Texas

- Location within Texas
- Interactive map of Roosevelt Park
- Type: Public City Park
- Location: 330 Roosevelt; San Antonio, Texas
- Coordinates: 29°24′3″N 98°29′19″W
- Area: 12.9 acres (0.052 km^{2})
- Created: 1920
- Operator: San Antonio Parks and Recreation

Roosevelt Park in San Antonio, Texas is named for President Theodore Roosevelt. The origins of the park date to 1888, when it was known as the International Fair Grounds. The name was changed to Roosevelt Park in 1920. Its current layout and design was created by the architectural firm of Hare & Hare, and for a brief time was known as Lambert Park, before returning the name to Roosevelt Park

In 1898, Army Lt. Colonel Roosevelt, and then-recent Congressional Medal of Honor recipient Col. Leonard Wood, established recruitment headquarters for the Spanish–American War at the Menger Hotel, with Wood signing up volunteers on the hotel patio and Roosevelt working out of its bar room. Enlistees were encamped and trained by Roosevelt in what is now the 12.9-acre Roosevelt Park.

The recruits would come to be known as Roosevelt's Rough Riders. Roosevelt himself noted that Texans, in particular active Texas Rangers, made up a large percentage of the volunteers.

The current park was once owned by Bexar County. When the City of San Antonio assumed ownership of the facility in 1920, the park was named Roosevelt Park.
