= Roosevelt Park (Malden) =

Park in Massachusetts, United States

Coordinates: 42°25′51″N 71°03′04″W

Roosevelt Park was a large open public park in Malden, Massachusetts with three baseball diamonds, open space for football games, a basketball court, a children's playground, and an old field house that had closed prior to the closing of the park itself. The park was also the home field for Malden Catholic High School's football program until the completion of their own stadium, Brother Gilbert Stadium, in 1988. The city of Malden announced plans in the mid-1990s to replace all of the public elementary schools in the city. Roosevelt Park was picked as a site to build a brand new Kindergarten-Eighth grade school. The park was officially closed in 1998. Construction began for the new school that same year. In 1999, the Salemwood Elementary School opened on the site of what was Roosevelt Park and today, part of the park remains for organised school sports events.
