= Roosevelt Park Elementary School =

Location
- 800 Summit Ave; Prince Rupert, British Columbia, V8J 3W2; Canada
- Coordinates: 54.3066°N 130.3270°W

Information
- School type: Public, Elementary School
- School board: School District 52 Prince Rupert
- School number: 5252006
- Principal: Susan Kobza
- Grades: K-5
- Enrollment: 204 (May 14, 2009)

Roosevelt Park Elementary is a public Elementary School in Prince Rupert, British Columbia, part of School District 52 Prince Rupert.

Because it was the lowest ranked school in British Columbia in 2005, Roosevelt Park Elementary was featured in a CBC documentary hosted by Mark Kelley. It has not ranked that low since that date. In 2009, Roosevelt enrolled 189 students in kindergarten through grade 7. In the 2011–2012 school year, Roosevelt Park Elementary began hosting the French Immersion Program along with the previous English program. It was also changed, along with all the other elementary schools in Prince Rupert, to a K-5 elementary school, with grades 6 to 8 heading to the area's middle school, Prince Rupert Middle School (PRMS).
