= Franklin Roosevelt Park =

- Franklin Roosevelt Park's location in Gauteng
- Coordinates: 26°09′05″S 27°59′20″E
- Country: South Africa
- Province: Gauteng
- City: Johannesburg

Area
  - Total: 1.58 km^{2} (0.61 sq mi)

Population (2011)
  - Total: 3,467
  - Density: 2,194/km^{2} (5,680/sq mi)

Races
  - White: 58.6%
  - Asian: 14.3%
  - Cape Coloured: 4.7%
  - Black: 20.7%
  - Other: 1.6%

Languages
  - English: 65.5%
  - Afrikaans: 17.8%
  - Zulu: 3.7%
  - Tswana: 3.2%
  - Other: 9.9%

Franklin Roosevelt Park is a north-western suburb of Johannesburg, South Africa, around 8 km northwest of City Hall, north of Montgomery Park and southwest of Linden.

== History ==
Franklin Roosevelt Park (commonly abbreviated to Roosevelt Park) was established on 3 March 1948 on Waterval Farm to house veterans of World War II. It was named after American President Franklin D. Roosevelt. The local English language high school is also named Roosevelt High School. Extension 1 was established on 31 October 1951.
