= Celeste Maloy =

American politician (born 1981)

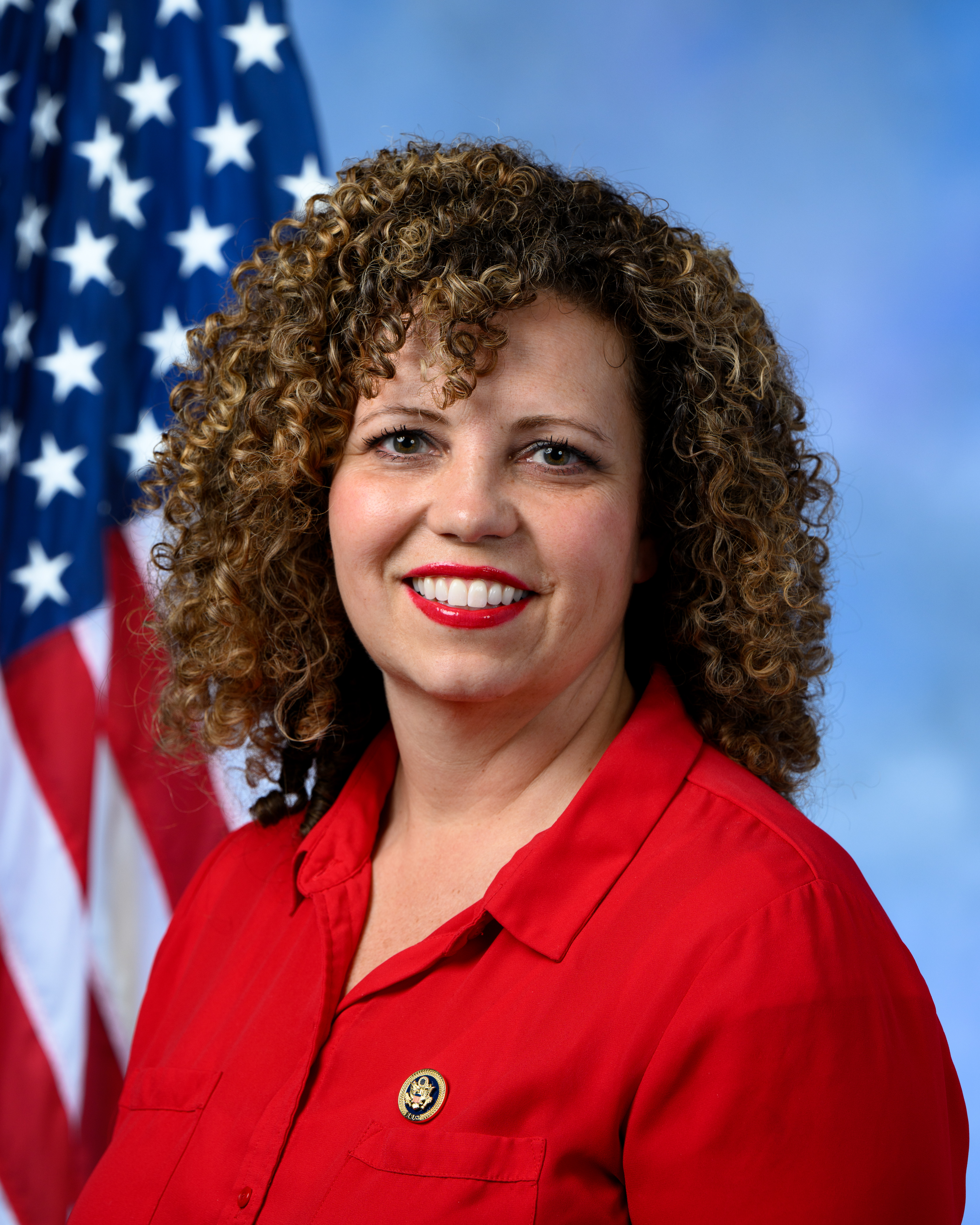
- Official portrait, 2024

Member of the U.S. House of Representatives from Utah's 2nd district
- Incumbent
- Assumed office November 21, 2023 (Note: Maloy's official service begins on the date of the special election, while she was not sworn in until November 28, 2023.)
- Preceded by: Chris Stewart

Personal details
- Born: May 22, 1981 (age 45) Cedar City, Utah, U.S.
- Party: Republican
- Relatives: Cliven Bundy (uncle); Ammon Bundy (cousin); Ryan Bundy (cousin)
- Education: Southern Utah University (BA); Brigham Young University (JD)
- Website: House website Campaign website

Celeste Maloy (born May 22, 1981) is an American politician and attorney serving as the U.S. representative for Utah's 2nd congressional district since 2023. She is a member of the Republican Party.

Previously, Maloy served as chief legal counsel to U.S. representative Chris Stewart and as the deputy county attorney for Washington County, Utah. Before her legal career, Maloy worked as a conservationist for the Natural Resources Conservation Service.

Maloy was first elected to Congress in a 2023 special election. She was re-elected to a full term in 2024 after winning the Republican primary by 176 votes.

== Early life and education ==
Maloy was born in Cedar City, Utah, and raised in Hiko, Nevada, in a single-wide trailer with five siblings; her mother, Cathy (née Turner), sold Avon products, while her father, Edward Maloy, was a volunteer firefighter. She is the niece by marriage of Cliven Bundy and the cousin of Ammon Bundy, known for their involvement in the 2014 Bundy standoff. Maloy later graduated from Pahranagat Valley High School in Alamo, Nevada. After graduating from high school, Maloy attended Southern Utah University, where she earned her degree in agriculture. She earned a Juris Doctor from J. Reuben Clark Law School at Brigham Young University in 2015.

== Early career ==
Maloy worked for 11 years as a soil conservationist for the Natural Resources Conservation Service in Utah.

After law school, Maloy worked in Washington County, Utah, as a deputy county attorney, specializing in issues of public land law involving land and water policy. She advocated on behalf of Utah landowners to the United States House Natural Resources Subcommittee on Oversight and Investigations. She has continued working with issues of land rights and ownership with the Utah Association of Counties and the Washington County Water Conservancy District. Her work as deputy county attorney in Washington County put her in frequent contact with U.S. Representative Chris Stewart, and in 2019, she was hired by Stewart as chief legal counsel for both his district and Washington, D.C. offices.

== U.S. House of Representatives ==
=== Elections ===
==== 2023 special ====
In June 2023, she announced her candidacy for the special election for Utah's 2nd congressional district after Representative Stewart announced his resignation to care for his wife's health issues. Stewart publicly endorsed Maloy after reports that thirteen Republicans had filed for the contested primary election.

On June 24, 2023, Maloy won the Utah Republican nominating convention for the 2nd district in an upset. However, she still had to face a primary election, as two other candidates had gathered enough signatures to make the primary ballot. Maloy won the most votes in a September 6 primary, winning the Republican nomination over former state representative Becky Edwards. Maloy faced state senator Kathleen Riebe in the general election on November 21 and won by a comfortable margin. She was sworn in on November 28, 2023.

==== 2024 ====
2024 GOP primary results by county: Maloy: 50–60%; 70–80%; Jenkins: 50–60%

Maloy faced multiple challengers in her first re-election bid, with her leading competitor being Colby Jenkins, a telecommunications businessman. Jenkins defeated Maloy at the state convention with 57% of the vote, but Utah law requires that any candidate who receives more than 40% of the vote at convention advance to a primary. The primary was held on June 25, 2024, and Maloy won by such a small margin that a recount was automatically triggered. On August 5, 2024, Utah Lt. Governor Deidre Henderson announced that the recount had confirmed Maloy's victory by 176 votes, allowing Maloy to advance to the general election against Democratic candidate Nathaniel Woodward and Constitution Party candidate Cassie Easley.

==== 2026 ====
Due to court-ordered redistricting in Utah, Maloy's home in Cedar City was drawn into the 3rd district. She sought reelection there, and defeated former Utah state representative Phil Lyman in the primary.

=== Committee assignments ===
- Committee on Appropriations
  - Subcommittee on Interior, Environment, and Related Agencies
  - Subcommittee on Energy and Water Development and Related Agencies
  - Subcommittee on Legislative Branch
- Committee on Natural Resources
  - Subcommittee on Federal Lands
  - Subcommittee on Water, Wildlife and Fisheries

=== Caucus memberships ===
- Congressional Colorado River Caucus
- Congressional FFA Caucus
- Congressional Wildfire Caucus
- Congressional Western Caucus

== Personal life ==
Maloy and her family are members of The Church of Jesus Christ of Latter-day Saints.

U.S. House of Representatives
Preceded by Chris Stewart	Member of the U.S. House of Representatives from Utah's 2nd congressional district 2023–present	Incumbent
Preceded by Mike Kennedy	Member of the U.S. House of Representatives from Utah's 3rd congressional district Taking office 2027	Elect
U.S. order of precedence (ceremonial)
Preceded by Gabe Amo	United States representatives by seniority 357th	Succeeded by Tim Kennedy
