= Forward Party of Utah =

Political party in Utah, United States

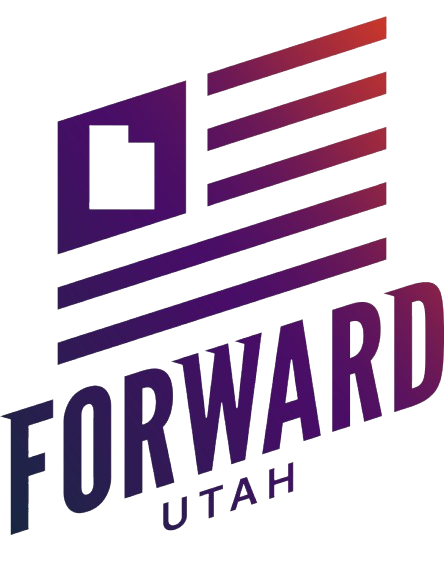
- Chairperson: Michelle Quist
- Founder: Richard Davis; Jim Bennett
- Founded: May 22, 2017; 9 years ago (as United Utah Party); April 26, 2025; 16 months ago (as Forward Party of Utah)
- Merger of: Utah Forward Party; United Utah Party
- Membership (2026): 3,028
- Ideology: Centrism; Third Way; Reformism
- Political position: Center
- National affiliation: Forward Party (since 2025)
- Colors: Maroon Purple Cyan Blue Red Navy White
- U.S. Senate (Utah Seats): 0 / 2
- U.S. House of Representatives (Utah Seats): 0 / 4
- Seats in the State Senate (Note: Utah State Senator Emily Buss was elected in a special election to replace Forward politician Daniel Thatcher, who switched to the party from the Republican Party): 1 / 29
- Seats in the State House: 0 / 75
- Other elected offices: 1 (Teri McCabe – Provo City School Board)

Website
- utahforwardparty.org

The Forward Party of Utah, formerly the United Utah Party (UUP), is a centrist political party in the U.S. state of Utah. Founded in 2017, the party identifies itself as politically moderate. The party's current name is the result of an April 2025 merger between the UUP and the Utah state branch of the Forward Party (FWD).

== History ==
=== Background and formation ===
Prior to the formation of the United Utah Party, Brigham Young University (BYU) political science professor Richard Davis had considered forming a political party for years. According to Davis, he found people were open to an alternative political party during the 2016 U.S. presidential election. He announced the formation of the party on May 22, 2017. Davis became a chairperson for the party. Jim Bennett, the son of former U.S. Senator Bob Bennett, was the party's executive director until he stepped down to run as the UUP's candidate in a special congressional election to replace Jason Chaffetz. Nils Bergeson, a former U.S. foreign service officer, was the party's second executive director in 2018.

=== Forward Party merger ===
On April 2, 2025, the party announced plans to merge with the Forward Party of Utah, and during a joint convention on April 26, members of both parties voted in favor of the merger.

== Political positions ==
The UUP focuses on 5 political priorities that party members refer to as the "5 E's": Economy, Education, Environment, Equality and Ethical Government. The 5th "E" of Ethical Government includes support for alternative voting methods (such as ranked choice voting and approval voting), more non-partisan elections, and opposing efforts to impose partisan politics on the judicial branch of government. According to former UUP chairman Richard Davis, the party's platform is mostly based on laws and principles, rather than specific policy positions. He told The Salt Lake Tribune that the party supports term limits, stricter campaign-finance laws, efforts to stop gerrymandering, and increased school funding. The party's platform also includes advocating for a healthy immigration system that creates and enforces fair laws. The party believes that public lands can be preserved while still allowing economic development. The UUP supports the right of responsible gun owners to possess firearms.

The UUP supports efforts to stop using taxpayer money in the Utah Republican Party's closed primary elections. On December 1, 2017, the party called for greater transparency regarding sexual harassment allegations on Capitol Hill. In January 2018, the UUP announced support for the "Our Schools Now" initiative, a proposed progressive tax meant to increase funding for education.

== Electoral history ==
=== 2017 Utah congressional election ===
On May 26, 2017, Jim Bennett attempted to apply as an affiliated candidate in Utah's 3rd congressional district special election, 2017, but the lieutenant governor's office rejected the application because the elections office had not had 30 days to finish certifying the new party. Bennett refused to register as an unaffiliated candidate. Utah's elections office certified the party on June 27, 2017.

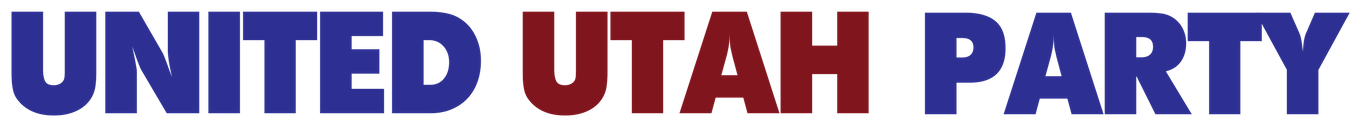
Former logo used in the 2017 and 2018 elections

On June 21, 2017, the UUP filed a lawsuit against Utah state officials to get Bennett's name on the ballot. In court, a Utah state attorney argued that the UUP could have formed earlier to meet the application deadline. A party lawyer argued that only a "soothsayer" could have predicted that Jason Chaffetz would resign from the U.S. House of Representatives. On August 2, 2017, a federal judge in charge of the case ordered Utah election officials to allow Bennett on the ballot under the United Utah Party.

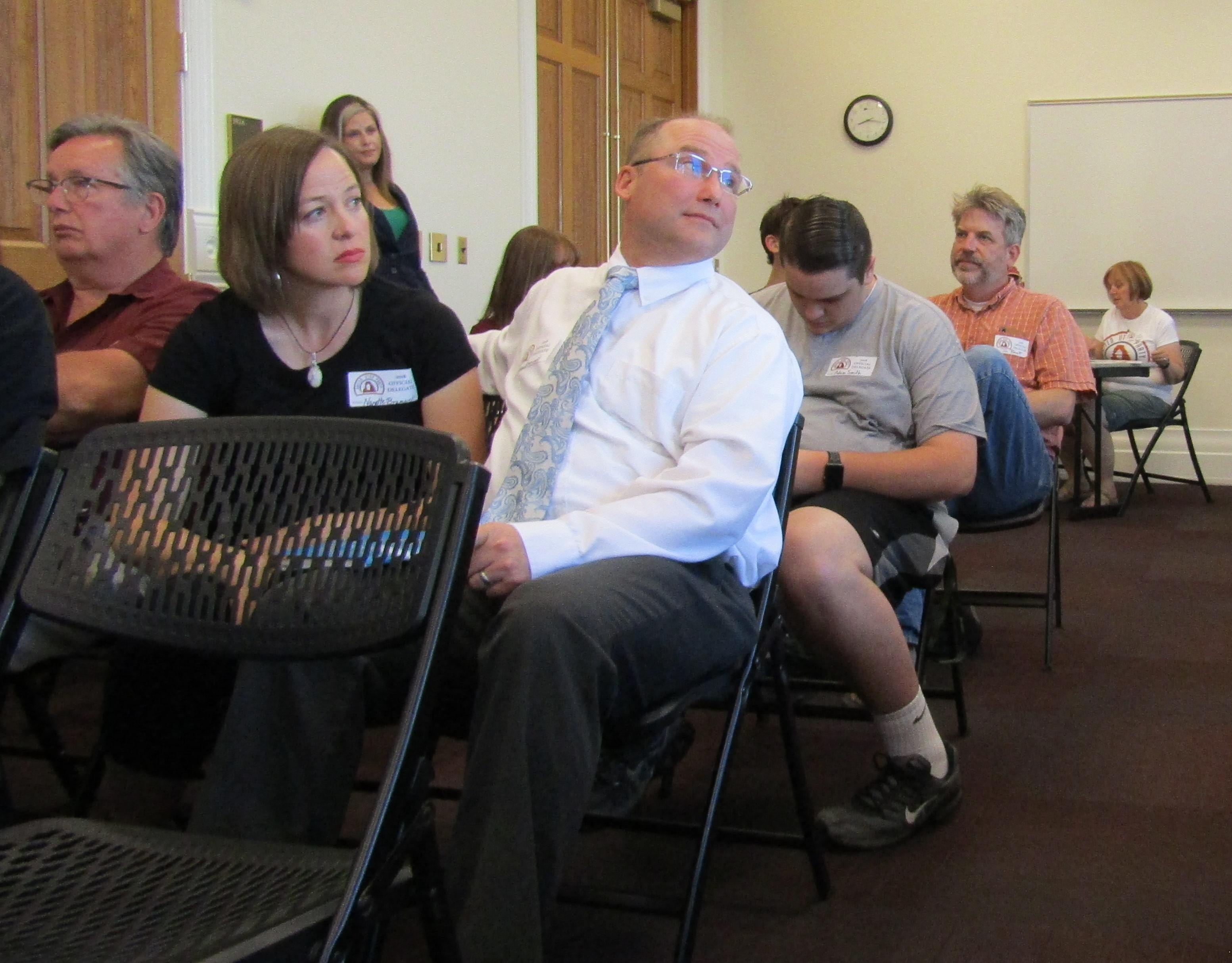
2018 UUP Convention

In late September 2017, Bennett narrowly qualified to participate in the Utah Debate Commission's selective debate, along with the election's Republican and Democratic candidates, John Curtis and Kathie Allen. The special election was held on November 7, 2017, and Bennett conceded the race hours after the polls closed, and initial results showed Curtis winning and Allen getting second place. Bennett got third place with 9.3% of the popular vote.

==== Results ====
Utah's 3rd congressional district special election, 2017
Party	Candidate	Votes	%
Republican	John Curtis	85,751	58.02%
Democratic	Kathie Allen	37,801	25.58%
United Utah	Jim Bennett	13,747	9.30%
Independent	Sean Whalen	4,554	3.08%
Libertarian	Joe Buchman	3,644	2.47%
Independent American	Jason Christensen	2,286	1.55%
Write-in	Brendan Phillips	8	0.01%
Write-in	Russell Paul Roesler	5	0.00%
Total votes		147,796	100.00%
Republican hold			

=== 2018 ===
In February 2018, two UUP candidates announced they would run for the United States House of Representatives: Jan Garbett and Logan, Utah native Eric Eliason, who challenged Republicans Chris Stewart and Rob Bishop respectively. On March 20, 2018, the United Utah Party held caucuses at 19 locations with attendance of just over 900 people, when the party had just over 400 registered members. Garbett later withdrew from the race. Eliason was defeated, receiving 11.6% of the vote as Rob Bishop was reelected to what would become his final term.

==== Results ====
Utah's 1st congressional district, 2018
Party	Candidate	Votes	%
Republican	Rob Bishop (incumbent)	156,692	61.6
Democratic	Lee Castillo	63,308	24.9
United Utah	Eric Eliason	29,547	11.6
Green	Adam Davis	4,786	1.9
Total votes		254,333	100.0
Republican hold			

Utah's 3rd congressional district, 2018
Party	Candidate	Votes	%
Republican	John Curtis (incumbent)	174,856	67.5
Democratic	James Singer	70,686	27.3
Independent American	Gregory Duerden	6,686	2.6
United Utah	Timothy Zeidner	6,630	2.6
Total votes		258,858	100.0
Republican hold			

=== 2020 ===
Name	Office	Votes	%	Position	Margin with winner
Brian Fabbi	State Auditor	173,644	13.0	2nd	61.8
Thomas McNeill	US Representative - CD3	7,040	2.0	4th	66.7
Jonia Broderick	US Representative - CD4	8,037	2.1	4th	45.6
Emily Bergeson	State Senator - SD7	11,351	22.3	2nd	55.4
Chris Rawlins	State Representative - HD6	4,767	19.6	2nd	60.8
Shawn Ferriola	State Representative - HD12	3,983	22.8	2nd	54.4
Ammon Gruwell	State Representative - HD15	5,301	22.8	2nd	54.4
Cabot Nelson	State Representative - HD25	607	3.0	3rd	79.8
Tanner Greenhalgh	State Representative - HD29	691	3.1	3rd	75.5
Adam Bean	State Representative - HD35	662	4.5	3rd	63.3
Dave Lundgren	State Representative - HD41	1,602	6.4	3rd	63.0
Ryan Boudwin	State Representative - HD42	1,178	4.9	3rd	53.6
Jeff Bardin	State Representative - HD43	825	5.4	3rd	47.0
John Jackson	State Representative - HD44	733	3.9	3rd	51.8
Joseph Shelton	State Representative - HD48	654	3.7	3rd	68.6
Kate Walters	State Representative - HD56	3,576	18.4	2nd	63.2
Homer Morrill	State Representative - HD58	809	4.8	3rd	79.8
Catherine Eslinger	State Representative - HD59	4,841	24.2	2nd	51.5
Christine Heath	State Representative - HD60	3,540	22.0	2nd	50.7
Nils Bergeson	State Representative - HD61	3,034	20.3	2nd	59.4
Austin Simcox	State Representative - HD63	588	7.6	3rd	53.4
Piper Manesse	State Representative - HD72	1,374	7.5	3rd	67.9
Ed Phillips	Millard County Commissioner	2,319	38.3	2nd	23.4
Monette Clark	San Juan County Commissioner	481	20.6	2nd	58.7
Larry Smith	Sanpete County Commissioner	2,672	22.1	2nd	55.8

=== 2022 ===
Name	Office	Votes	%	Position	Margin with winner
Evan McMullin	Senate (endorse)	459,958	42.7	2nd	10.5
Thomas Horne	State Treasurer (special)	94,265	9.6	3rd	64.5
Jay Mcfarland	US Representative - CD2	8,622	3.3	3rd	56.4
January Walker	US Representative - CD4	16,740	6.6	3rd	54.5
Kimberly Wagner	State Senator - SD7	10,651	28.1	2nd	43.8
Dennis Roach	State Senator - SD14	929	1.8	3rd	60.4
Jed Nordfeldt	State Senator - SD18	1,842	5.1	3rd	61.3
Tyler Peterson	State Senator - SD19	3,301	6.9	3rd	51.5
Patricia Bradford	State Senator - SD28	3,354	9.0	3rd	71.9
Ammon Gruwell	State Representative - HD15	3,147	22.4	2nd	55.3
Cabot Nelson	State Representative - HD23	535	2.6	3rd	74.0
Evan Rodgers	State Representative - HD30	638	6.2	3rd	42.5
Adam Bean	State Representative - HD32	353	2.7	3rd	69.9
Tim Loftis	State Representative - HD40	439	3.8	3rd	52.0
David Jack	State Representative - HD42	4,326	21.7	2nd	36.1
Ladd Johnson	State Representative - HD46	5,562	35.5	2nd	29.1
Dave Lundgren	State Representative - HD47	4,530	29.8	2nd	40.4
Andrew Matishen	State Representative - HD54	993	5.5	3rd	74.6
Alan Wessman	State Representative - HD64	2,761	20.0	2nd	60.0
Zeno Parry	State Representative - HD70	1,228	8.1	2nd	83.8
Piper Manesse	State Representative - HD71	886	7.2	3rd	69.3
Jonathan Munoz	Millard County Commissioner	2,188	43.2	2nd	13.7

=== 2023 ===
In 2023, Chris Stewart resigned as the representative of Utah's 2nd congressional district, prompting a special election on November 21. January Walker, the party's nominee for the 4th district in 2022, won the United Utah Party's nominating convention, placing 5th in the special election with 2,856 votes and 1.81%.

=== 2024 ===
Candidates

Name	Office	Votes	%	Position	Margin with winner
Vaughn Cook	US Representative - CD4	17,347	4.77	3rd of 4	58.65
Michelle Quist	State Attorney General	103,831	7.16	3rd of 5	50.60
Cabot Nelson	State Representative - HD23	481	1.93	3rd of 3	69.73
Dennis Roach	State Representative - HD34	519	2.49	3rd of 3	60.47
John Jackson	State Representative - HD40	483	3.12	3rd of 3	54.22
Dave Lundgren	State Representative - HD47	5,034	24.92	2nd of 2	50.16
Alex Day	State Representative - HD53	3,943	19.98	2nd of 2	60.04
Zeno Parry	State Representative - HD70	1,399	6.69	2nd of 2	86.62
Alan Wessman	Utah County Commissioner	61,604	22.81	2nd of 2	54.38
Tori Broughton	Wasatch County Councilor	690	24.25	2nd of 3	29.70

=== 2026 ===
Candidates

Name	Office	Votes	%	Position	Margin with winner
January Walker	US Representative - CD1				
Julie Quinlan	State Senator - SD1				
Josh Smith	State Senator - SD6				
J. Lowry Snow	State Senator - SD9				
Emily Buss (incumbent)	State Senator - SD11				
Colin Smith	State Senator - SD13				
Annette Mcrae	State Senator - SD20				
Wayne Woodfield	State Senator - SD21				
Ben Shaw	State Representative - HD3				
James Rich	State Representative - HD6				
Libby Shelton	State Representative - HD8				
Shawn Ferriola	State Representative - HD12				
Tony De Mille	State Representative - HD13				
Kimberly Wagner	State Representative - HD17				
Cabot W. Nelson	State Representative - HD23				
Travis Alico	State Representative - HD26				
Jeffrey Marshall	State Representative - HD27				
Wales Nematollahi	State Representative - HD28				
Tynley Bean	State Representative - HD29				
John Jackson	State Representative - HD40				
John Boyd	State Representative - HD53				
Julie Smith	State Representative - HD63				
Zeno Parry	State Representative - HD70				

== Elected officials ==
=== Utah State Senate ===
- Senator Emily Buss, 11th district (2025–present)

=== Municipal ===
- Provo
  - School Board
    - Teri McCabe

== See also ==
- Forward Independence Party
