= Chris Stewart (Utah politician) =

American politician & author (born 1960)

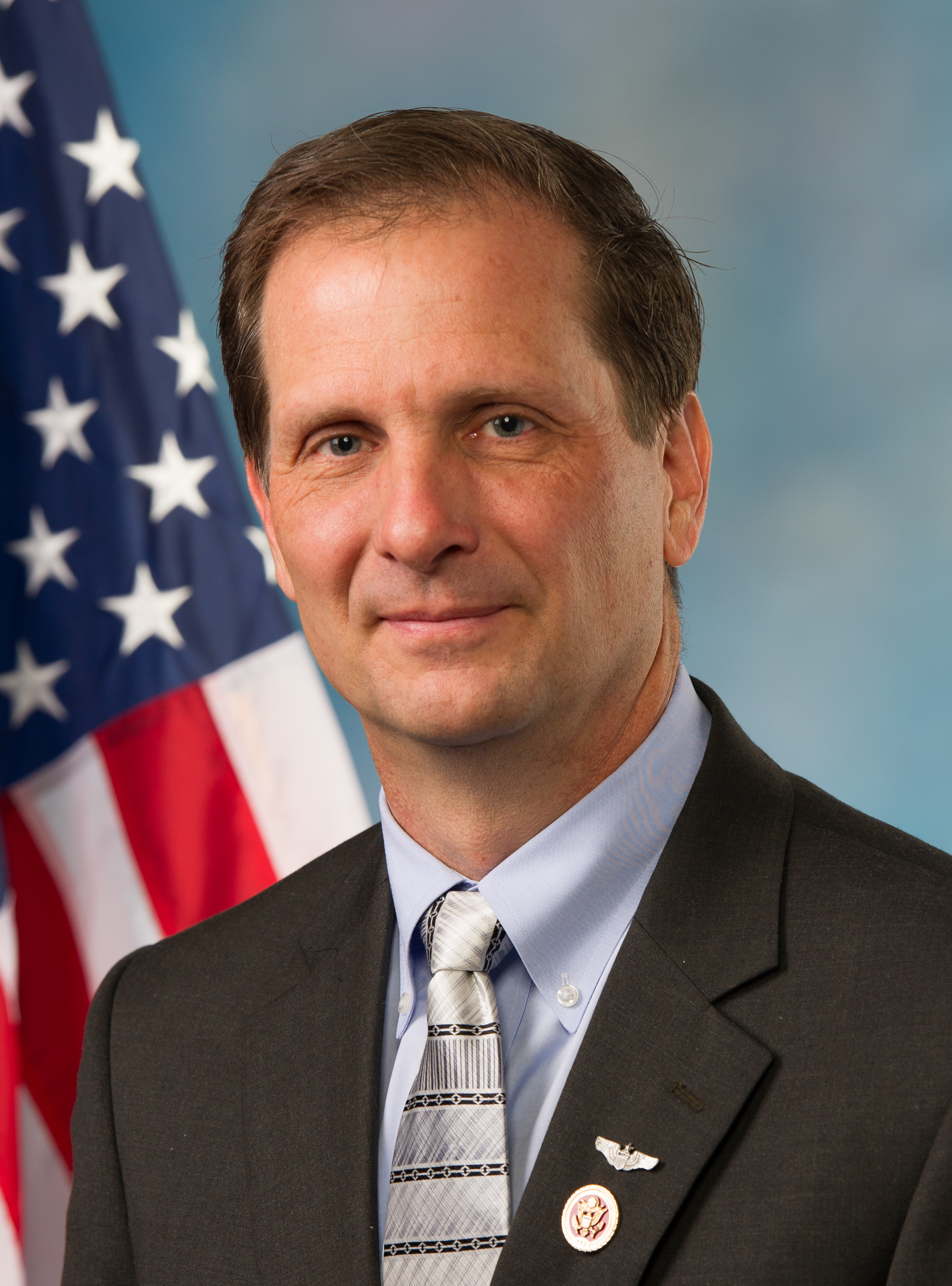
- Official portrait, 2015

Member of the U.S. House of Representatives from Utah's 2nd district
- In office January 3, 2013 – September 15, 2023
- Preceded by: Jim Matheson
- Succeeded by: Celeste Maloy

Personal details
- Born: Christopher Douglas Stewart; July 15, 1960 (age 66) Logan, Utah, U.S.
- Party: Republican
- Spouse: Evie Stewart
- Relations: Ted Stewart (brother)
- Children: 6
- Education: Utah State University (BA)

Military service
- Branch/service: United States Air Force
- Years of service: 1984–1998
- Rank: Major

Christopher Douglas Stewart (born July 15, 1960) is an American politician, author, and businessman who served as the U.S. representative for Utah's 2nd congressional district from 2013 until his resignation in 2023. A member of the Republican Party, he is known for his bestsellers Seven Miracles That Saved America and The Miracle of Freedom: Seven Tipping Points That Saved the World, as well as his series The Great and Terrible.

Stewart graduated from Utah State University in 1984 before joining the United States Air Force. Later, he began writing novels and became president and CEO of the Shipley Group. He was first elected to the U.S. House of Representatives in 2012 and was re-elected five times.

Stewart formally announced on May 31, 2023, that he intended to resign from Congress to focus on helping take care of his wife's health issues. He resigned on September 15.

== Early life and education ==
Stewart was born in Logan, Utah, and grew up on a dairy farm in Cache Valley. His father was a retired Air Force pilot and teacher. His mother, Sybil S. Stewart, was a full-time homemaker and was recognized as the Utah Mother of the Year in 1996.

Stewart graduated from Sky View High School in 1978 and entered Utah State University that year. After a year in college, he served as a missionary for The Church of Jesus Christ of Latter-day Saints in Texas. After his church service, Stewart reentered Utah State, and in 1984 earned a degree in economics from its College of Business.

== Military service ==
After college, Stewart was accepted into the Air Force's Officer Training School, followed by assignment to Undergraduate Pilot Training, graduating at the top of his class in both instances. Stewart flew both helicopters and jet aircraft in the military.

Stewart served in the Air Force for 14 years, initially flying rescue helicopters and then transitioning to fixed-wing jets and flying the B-1B bomber. He was stationed at Dyess Air Force Base, Mountain Home Air Force Base, and other Air Force bases.

In 1995, Stewart was awarded the Mackay Trophy for "significant aerial achievement" for the combat capability operation known as Coronet Bat. On June 3, 1995, Stewart and a flight of two B-1s set the world record for the fastest nonstop flight around the world. He was the mission's senior project officer. The mission's purpose was to demonstrate the B-1 Lancer's capability with live bombing activity over three bombing ranges on three continents in two hemispheres. In the process, the team set three world records, flying 36,797.65 kilometers in 36 hours and 13 minutes.

== Private sector career ==
=== Business career ===
After his military career, Stewart entered the private sector. He was president and CEO of the Shipley Group, a consulting company that specializes in energy and environmental issues. Shipley also participates in government anti-terrorism training, corporate security and executive preparedness consulting. Stewart sold his majority ownership in Shipley Group in December 2012 before being sworn in as a U.S. congressman.

=== Writing career ===
Stewart began writing books in the late 1990s. His first novel, Shattered Bone, was published in 1998. Stewart wrote four additional techno-thrillers before he began writing the series The Great and Terrible. Before completing his last book in that series, he started writing historical novels. His book Seven Miracles That Saved America was chosen as "Book of the Month", and The Miracle of Freedom: Seven Tipping Points That Saved the World became a New York Times Bestseller within two weeks of publication and was selected for the National Communications Award by the Freedom Foundation at Valley Forge. The Miracle of Freedom and Seven Miracles That Saved America were co-written with his brother, U.S. district judge Ted Stewart. The Miracle of Freedom was endorsed by radio/talk show host Glenn Beck, who has been credited for making the book a bestseller. Stewart has written 14 books. He worked with Elizabeth Smart to co-write her memoir, My Story. In 2005, the Mormon Tabernacle Choir performed A Christmas Bell for Anya, which he co-authored with his wife Evie.

== U.S. House of Representatives ==
=== Elections ===
==== 2012 ====
On October 21, 2011, Utah Policy wrote that Stewart was going to run for Congress in Utah's 2nd congressional district. His formal announcement took place on December 6, 2011.

In February 2012, Stewart released a campaign video expressing his view that "if we don't make some difficult decisions now, if we don't show the courage to do what we have to do to save our country, we won't make it for another 10 years." He also said that "at critical times in our history... we literally had miracles where God intervened to save us."

On April 21, 2012, at a controversial nominating convention, Stewart secured the Republican nomination. Before the convention, an anonymous anti-Stewart mailer was sent to convention delegates. In his speech to delegates, another candidate, Milt Hanks, alleged that the other candidates had made an anti-Stewart pact. Stewart's opponents considered the mailer and the allegations to be a set-up to elicit sympathy for Stewart's candidacy; they later filed a complaint with the Federal Election Commission over the incident. A subsequent party inquiry showed no proof of wrongdoing by any candidate.

Stewart won the general election with 62% of the vote, defeating Jay Seegmiller, and took office on January 3, 2013.

==== 2014 ====
In the 2014 election, Stewart was challenged by Luz Robles, a state senator and vice president of Zions Bank. Robles suspended campaigning for two months to serve as caregiver for her daughter and mother, who were seriously injured in a car accident.

==== 2016 ====
In the 2016 election, Stewart faced Charlene Albarran, a business owner. Stewart defeated Albarran with 62% of the vote.

==== 2018 ====
Stewart faced Shireen Ghorbani, an Iranian-American, in the 2018 election. As of April 2018, Stewart had six times as much cash on hand as Ghorbani. Stewart defeated Ghorbani with 56% of the vote.

==== 2020 ====
UtahPolicy.com reported that the Democratic Congressional Campaign Committee considered Stewart potentially vulnerable to a strong opponent in 2020, due to Donald Trump's unpopularity in the 2nd district and Stewart's record of defending him. A July 2019 poll showed Stewart with the lowest overall approval rating of any Utah congressperson with 26%; however, it also showed a high number of voters who had no opinion or did not know Stewart, with 41% in total. Analyst Kelly Patterson attributed this to a low amount of media coverage that would boost Stewart's name recognition.

A poll taken in January 2020 among likely voters showed Stewart with 38% of the vote and a Democratic challenger with 36% of the vote. The remainder were undecided or voting for someone else.

Stewart defeated Kael Weston, the Democratic nominee and a former State Department employee, in the general election, with 61% of the vote to Weston's 35%.

==== 2022 ====
In 2022, Stewart faced Democratic nominee Nick Mitchell in the general election. He was re-elected to a sixth term in office with 59.7% of the vote to Mitchell's 34.0%.

=== Tenure ===
Stewart chaired the House Subcommittee on the Environment.

In 2016, Stewart introduced a bill to allow unused Ebolavirus funding to research and combat the Zika virus. In 2017, the proposal was adopted as part of a separate bill, the Zika Response Appropriations Act, which shifted $622 million in unused Ebola funding to fight Zika.

=== Committee assignments ===
- Permanent Select Committee on Intelligence HPSCI Majority Members | The Permanent Select Committee on Intelligence
- Committee on Appropriations
  - Subcommittee on Labor, Health and Human Services, Education, and Related Agencies
  - Subcommittee on Interior, Environment, and Related Agencies
  - Subcommittee on the Legislative Branch

=== Caucus memberships ===
- Republican Study Committee
- Anti-Socialism Caucus (chair)
- Congressional Western Caucus
- United States Congressional International Conservation Caucus
- U.S.-Japan Caucus

== Electoral history ==
Utah's 2nd congressional district: Results 2012–2022
Year	Republican	Votes	Pct	Democrat	Votes	Pct	3rd Party	Party	Votes	Pct
2012	Chris Stewart	154,523	62	Jay Seegmiller	83,176	33	Jonathan D. Garrard	Constitution	5,051	2
2014	Chris Stewart	88,915	61	Luz Robles	47,585	33	Shaun McCausland	Constitution	4,509	3
2016	Chris Stewart	170,524	62	Charlene Albarran	93,778	34	Paul McCollaum Jr.	Constitution	12,517	5
2018	Chris Stewart	151,489	56	Shireen Ghorbani	105,051	39	Jeffrey Whipple	Libertarian	13,504	5
2020	Chris Stewart	208,997	59	Kael Weston	129,762	37	J. Robert Latham	Libertarian	15,465	4
2022	Chris Stewart	154,883	60	Nick Mitchell	88,224	34	Jay Mcfarland	United Utah	8,622	3

== Political positions ==
=== Healthcare ===
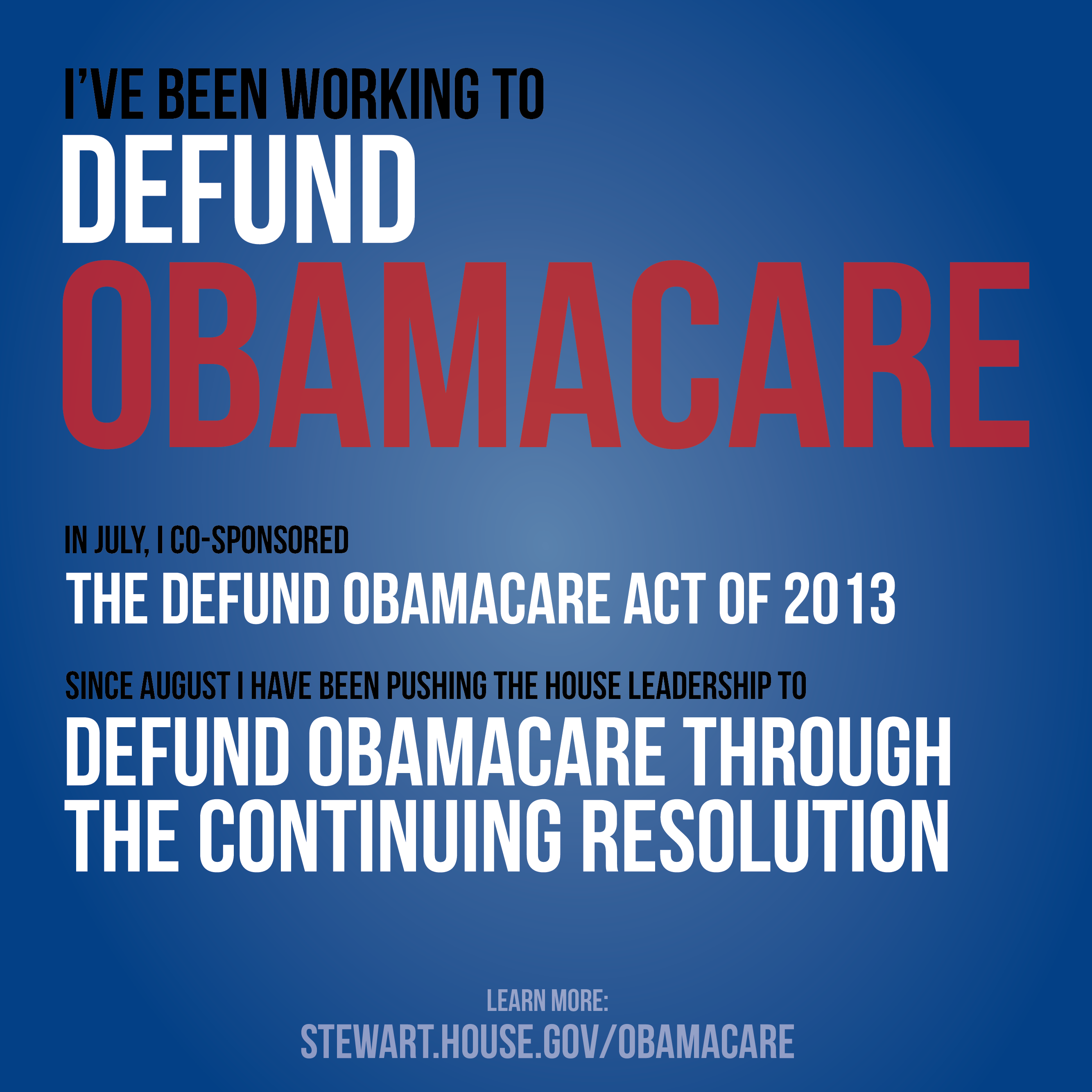
Stewart's official congressional webpage highlighted his efforts to defund and repeal Obamacare.

According to his website, since arriving in Congress, Stewart "consistently supported efforts to defund and repeal Obamacare." He co-sponsored the Defund Obamacare Act of 2013 and supported other efforts to "repeal, defund or dismantle the law." He also promised to "continue to do all that [he] can to seek strategic opportunities to... defund, delay and repeal this healthcare law." In place of Obamacare, Stewart supported the American Healthcare Reform Act.

Stewart is an advocate for mental health; according to Roll Call, one of his "signature legislative accomplishments" was assisting in the creation of the 988 Suicide & Crisis Lifeline, a federally-operated crisis hotline for mental health and suicide prevention at the phone number 988. It replaced the previous National Suicide Prevention Lifeline, and became active in July 2022.

=== Environment ===
As of 2013, Stewart rejected the idea that climate change is caused by human activity.

In 2014, Stewart sponsored H.R. 1422 (113th Congress), the EPA Science Advisory Board Reform Act of 2014, which would reform the composition and activities of the Environmental Protection Agency's science advisory board. Under the bill, at least 10% of the members of the board would be required to be from state, local, or tribal governments, corporate and industry experts would no longer be excluded from the board, and board members would be prohibited from advising the EPA in discussions that cite their work. The bill was opposed by Democrats and critics such as the Union of Concerned Scientists, who said it would enable conflicts of interest and restrict scientists' ability to provide proper advice to the government.

Stewart has a 5% lifetime rating from the League of Conservation Voters.

=== Economic issues ===
During the 2012 campaign, Stewart stated "we can't continue to have 1.2-, 1.3-, 1.4-trillion-dollar deficits for the foreseeable future and just pretend that that's not going to matter, because it will."

Stewart supports simplifying the tax code, lowering the corporate tax rate, and eliminating the estate tax. He voted for the Tax Cuts and Jobs Act of 2017.

=== LGBT rights ===
Stewart was the lead sponsor of the Fairness for All Act, a Republican alternative to the Equality Act. In 2015, he expressed his disagreement with Obergefell v. Hodges, in which the Supreme Court held that same-sex marriage bans violate the constitution.

On July 19, 2022, Stewart and 46 other Republican Representatives voted with the Democrats for the Respect for Marriage Act, which would codify the right to same-sex marriage in federal law.

=== Bundy standoff ===
In an interview regarding the Bundy standoff of 2014, Stewart said that the Bureau of Land Management could have avoided the standoff by allowing local sheriffs to intervene. Citing concerns about the level of weaponry federal agents carried, he also sponsored a bill (H.R. 4934) to demilitarize federal regulatory agencies.

=== Donald Trump ===
Stewart was considered "one of President Trump's most steadfast defenders in Congress." For instance, after Trump said he would be open to receiving intelligence on a campaign opponent from a foreign country and not alerting the FBI, Stewart defended him, saying that if the information is "credible, I think it would be foolish not to take that information." According to Ellen Weintraub, the chairwoman of the Federal Election Commission, it is illegal for a campaign to accept anything of value from a foreign person or entity in regard to a U.S. election.

According to political polling and reporting website FiveThirtyEight, Stewart's votes aligned with Trump's positions about 95% of the time. Stewart was reportedly under consideration to serve in the Trump administration as acting Director of National Intelligence, but Richard Grenell was chosen instead.

During the 2016 Republican presidential primary, Stewart was critical of Trump. Addressing an audience at the Hinckley Institute of Politics, Stewart compared him to fascist dictator Benito Mussolini, saying, "if some of you are Donald Trump supporters, we see the world differently, because I can't imagine what someone is thinking."

==== Mueller investigation ====
After Attorney General William Barr released a redacted version of the Mueller Report, Stewart released the following statement:

Mr. Mueller conducted a detailed and thorough investigation that mirrors what we found in the House Intelligence investigation—no collusion or conspiracy between the Trump Campaign and Russia.

Stewart's statement did not address the issue of obstruction of justice. The Mueller Report stated that "while this report does not conclude that the President committed a crime, it also does not exonerate him" from the charge of obstruction of justice.

After the report's release, Stewart accused the "former leadership" of the FBI, the Department of Justice, and the CIA of "astounding" corruption, without providing any details or supporting evidence. He also called for a second special counsel to investigate Hillary Clinton's emails and allegations of spying on the Trump campaign that led to the Mueller investigation.

Stewart was the only member of Congress from Utah to question Mueller during his appearance before Congress on July 24, 2019. He confronted Mueller about leaks that he asserted came from Mueller's office and were allegedly "designed to weaken or embarrass" Trump. Others, including Washington, D.C.-area media reporters, considered Mueller's office an unlikely source of the leaks.

==== Ukraine scandal and impeachment inquiry ====
Stewart defended Trump's actions with regard to the Trump–Ukraine scandal. In his opening statement during impeachment proceedings as a member of the House Intelligence Committee, Stewart apparently characterized the impeachment inquiry as a coup d'état when he said, "the coup has started", but later declined to clarify his remark.

During the impeachment hearings, Stewart repeatedly defended Trump's behavior, criticized witnesses whose testimony implicated Trump in wrongdoing, and criticized the impeachment process. He called for Adam Schiff, the chair of the United States House Permanent Select Committee on Intelligence, to recuse himself from the investigation of Trump's dealings.

When Trump called for Senator Mitt Romney's "impeachment" and Stewart was asked to comment, he declined to defend Romney. Romney had expressed support for the committee's inquiry. (Senators cannot be impeached.)

On December 18, 2019, Stewart voted against both articles of impeachment against Trump.

=== Immigration ===
Stewart supports DACA.

=== Foreign policy ===
In June 2021, Stewart was one of 49 House Republicans to vote to repeal the AUMF against Iraq.

== Personal life ==
Stewart is married to his wife Evie; the couple have six children together, three of whom still lived in Utah as of Stewart's inauguration in 2013. During his tenure, he spent his weekends at their home in Farmington, Utah. Evie Stewart has reportedly suffered from unspecified health issues as of 2023, which Stewart cited in his resignation.

U.S. House of Representatives
Preceded by Jim Matheson	Member of the U.S. House of Representatives from Utah's 2nd congressional district 2013–2023	Succeeded by Celeste Maloy
U.S. order of precedence (ceremonial)
Preceded by Rod Chandler as Former U.S. Representative	Order of precedence of the United States as Former U.S. Representative	Followed by John Sullivan as Former U.S. Representative
