= 2000 United States gubernatorial elections =

- November 7, 2000

13 governorships 11 states; 2 territories
	Majority party	Minority party
Party	Republican	Democratic
Seats before	30	18
Seats after	29	19
Seat change	▼1	▲1
Popular vote	5,966,679	6,942,442
Percentage	45.10%	52.48%
Seats up	4	7
Seats won	3	8
- Map of the results Democratic hold Republican hold Democratic gain Popular Democratic gain Nonpartisan No election

United States gubernatorial elections were held on November 7, 2000, in 11 states and two territories. The elections coincided with the presidential election. Democrats gained one seat by defeating an incumbent in West Virginia. As of 2026, this remains the last gubernatorial cycle in which a Democrat won in Indiana.

== Race Summary ==
=== States ===
State	Incumbent	Party	First elected	Result	Candidates
Delaware	Tom Carper	Democratic	1992	Incumbent term-limited. Democratic hold.	▌ ✓ Ruth Ann Minner (Democratic) 59.2%; ▌John M. Burris (Republican) 39.7%; ▌Floyd E. McDowell (Independent) 1.0%
Indiana	Frank O'Bannon	Democratic	1996	Incumbent re-elected.	▌ ✓ Frank O'Bannon (Democratic) 56.6%; ▌David M. McIntosh (Republican) 41.7%; ▌Andrew Horning (Libertarian) 1.8%
Missouri	Roger B. Wilson	Democratic	2000 (Note: Wilson took office after his predecessor (Mel Carnahan) was term-limited but died from a plane crash.)	Incumbent retired. Democratic hold.	▌ ✓ Bob Holden (Democratic) 49.1%; ▌Jim Talent (Republican) 48.2%; ▌Larry Rice (Independent) 1.5%
Montana	Marc Racicot	Republican	1992	Incumbent term-limited. Republican hold.	▌ ✓ Judy Martz (Republican) 51.0%; ▌Mark O'Keefe (Democratic) 47.1%; ▌Stan Jones (Libertarian) 1.9%
New Hampshire	Jeanne Shaheen	Democratic	1996	Incumbent re-elected.	▌ ✓ Jeanne Shaheen (Democratic) 48.7%; ▌Gordon J. Humphrey (Republican) 43.7%; ▌Mary Brown (Independent) 6.4%; ▌John J. Babiarz (Libertarian) 1.1%
North Carolina	Jim Hunt	Democratic	1976; 1984 (term-limited); 1992	Incumbent term-limited. Democratic hold.	▌ ✓ Mike Easley (Democratic) 52.0%; ▌Richard Vinroot (Republican) 46.3%; ▌Barbara Howe (Libertarian) 1.4%
North Dakota	Ed Schafer	Republican	1992	Incumbent retired. Republican hold.	▌ ✓ John Hoeven (Republican) 55.0%; ▌Heidi Heitkamp (Democratic) 45.0%
Utah	Mike Leavitt	Republican	1992	Incumbent re-elected.	▌ ✓ Mike Leavitt (Republican) 55.8%; ▌Bill Orton (Democratic) 42.3%
Vermont	Howard Dean	Democratic	1991 (Note: Dean took office after his predecessor (Richard Snelling) died. He was subsequently elected in the 1992 Vermont gubernatorial election.)	Incumbent re-elected.	▌ ✓ Howard Dean (Democratic) 50.5%; ▌Ruth Dwyer (Republican) 38.0%; ▌Anthony Pollina (Progressive) 9.6%
Washington	Gary Locke	Democratic	1996	Incumbent re-elected.	▌ ✓ Gary Locke (Democratic) 58.4%; ▌John Carlson (Republican) 39.7%; ▌Steve LePage (Libertarian) 1.9%
West Virginia	Cecil Underwood	Republican	1956; 1960 (term-limited); 1996	Incumbent lost re-election. Democratic gain.	▌ ✓ Bob Wise (Democratic) 50.1%; ▌Cecil Underwood (Republican) 47.2%; ▌Denise Giardina (Mountain) 1.6%

=== Territories ===
State	Incumbent	Party	First elected	Result	Candidates
American Samoa	Tauese Sunia	Democratic	1996	Incumbent re-elected.	▌ ✓ Tauese Sunia (Democratic) 51.4%; ▌L. Peter Reid (Independent) 48.6%
Puerto Rico	Pedro Rosselló	New Progressive	1992	Incumbent retired. Popular Democratic gain.	▌ ✓ Sila María Calderón (PPD) 48.6%; ▌Carlos Pesquera (PNP) 45.7%; ▌Rubén Berríos Martínez (PIP) 5.2%

== Closest races ==
States where the margin of victory was under 1%:

1. Missouri, 0.9%

States where the margin of victory was under 5%:

1. American Samoa, 2.8%
2. West Virginia, 2.9%
3. Puerto Rico, 3.0%
4. Montana, 3.9%

States where the margin of victory was under 10%:

1. New Hampshire, 5.0%
2. North Carolina, 5.8%

== Delaware ==
2000 Delaware gubernatorial election
- November 7, 2000
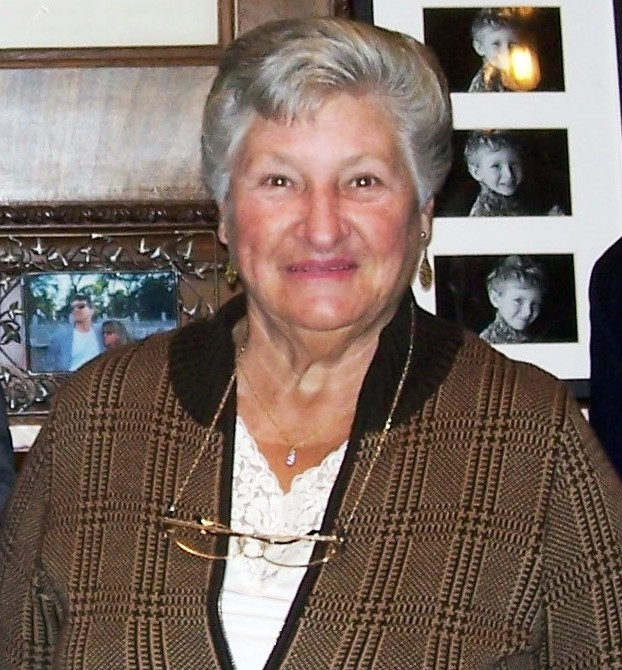

Nominee	Ruth Ann Minner	John Burris
Party	Democratic	Republican
Popular vote	191,695	128,603
Percentage	59.2%	39.8%
- County results Minner: 50–60% 60–70%
Governor before election
Tom Carper
Democratic
Elected Governor
Ruth Ann Minner
Democratic

The 2000 Delaware gubernatorial election was held on November 7, 2000, coinciding with the U.S. presidential election. Incumbent governor Tom Carper was term-limited and instead successfully ran for the United States Senate. Lieutenant Governor and Democratic nominee Ruth Ann Minner squared off against Republican nominee John M. Burris and won in a landslide on election day.

== Indiana ==
2000 Indiana gubernatorial election
- November 7, 2000
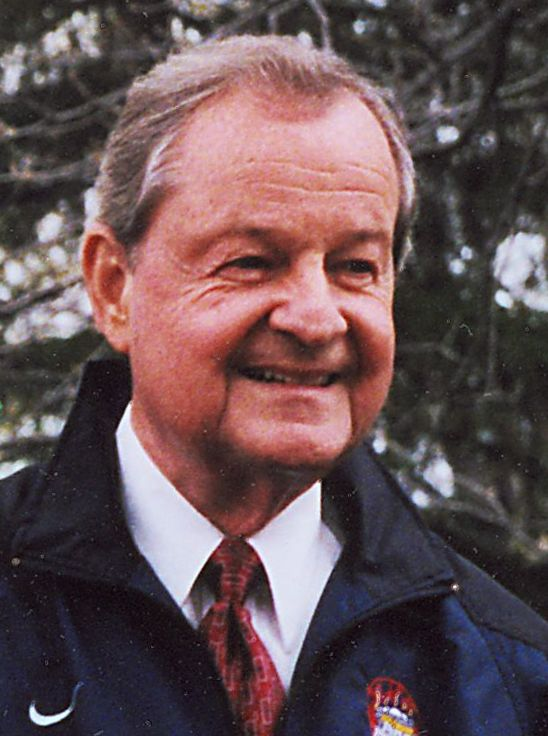

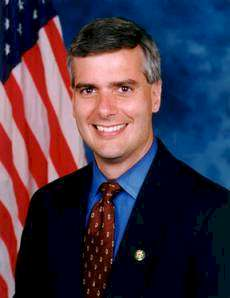
Nominee	Frank O'Bannon	David McIntosh
Party	Democratic	Republican
Running mate	Joe Kernan	J. Murray Clark
Popular vote	1,232,525	908,285
Percentage	56.6%	41.7%
- County results O'Bannon: 40–50% 50–60% 60–70% 70–80% McIntosh: 40–50% 50–60%
Governor before election
Frank O'Bannon
Democratic
Elected Governor
Frank O'Bannon
Democratic

The 2000 Indiana gubernatorial election was held on November 7, 2000. Incumbent governor Frank O'Bannon, a Democrat, was re-elected over Republican David M. McIntosh with 57% of the vote. Libertarian Andrew Horning also ran and received 2% of the vote. O'Bannon's victory was the fourth consecutive election in which a Democrat was elected Governor of Indiana, the longest winning streak for that party in the state since the Civil War. As of 2023, this was the last time a Democrat was elected Governor of Indiana.

== Missouri ==
2000 Missouri gubernatorial election
- November 7, 2000
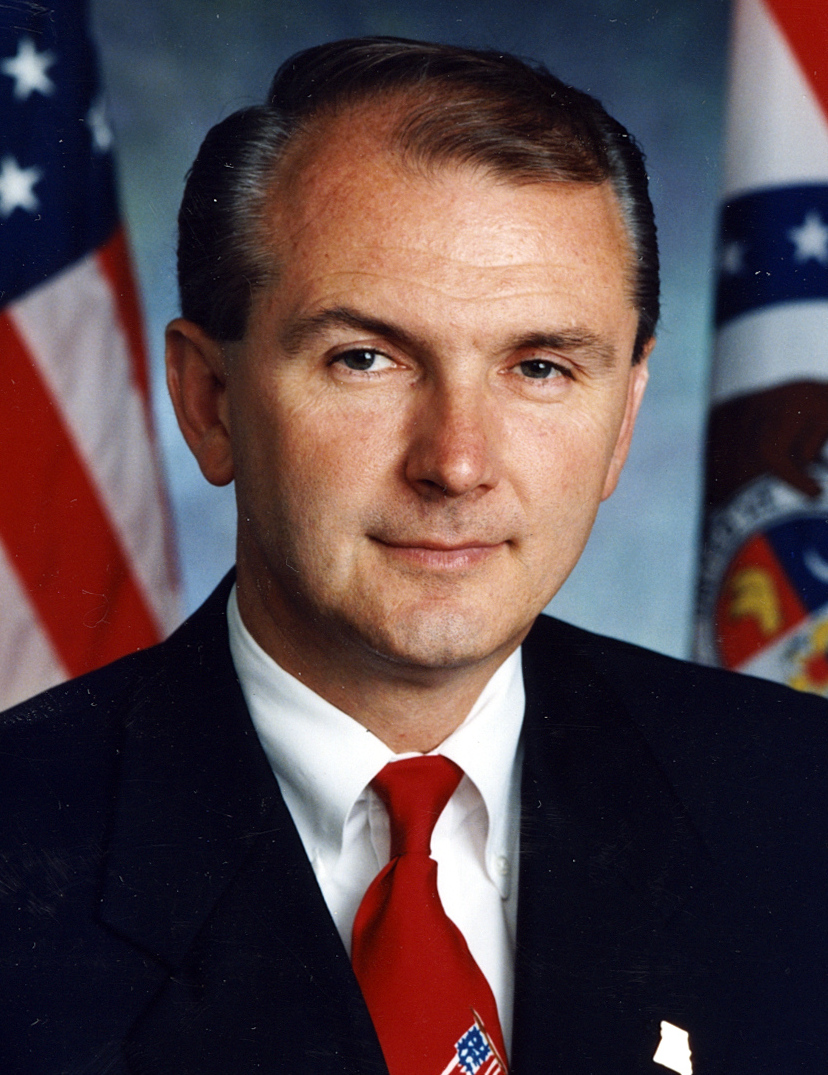

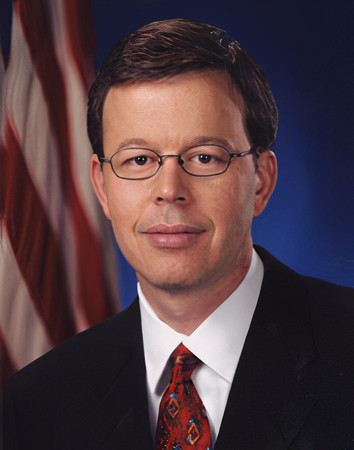
Nominee	Bob Holden	Jim Talent
Party	Democratic	Republican
Popular vote	1,152,752	1,131,307
Percentage	49.12%	48.21%
- County results Holden: 40–50% 50–60% 60–70% 70–80% Talent: 40–50% 50–60% 60–70% 70–80%
Governor before election
Roger B. Wilson
Democratic
Elected Governor
Bob Holden
Democratic

The 2000 Missouri gubernatorial election was held on November 7, 2000 and resulted in a narrow victory for the Democratic nominee, State Treasurer of Missouri Bob Holden, over the Republican candidate, U.S. Representative Jim Talent, and several other candidates. Incumbent Democratic governor Mel Carnahan was term-limited and could not run for re-election to a third term in office. However, he was killed in a plane crash on October 16, 2000, while campaigning for Missouri's Class 1 Senate seat. Lieutenant Governor Roger B. Wilson succeeded to the office following Carnahan's death.

Coincidentally, Talent would later be elected at the 2002 Senate special election and defeated Mel Carnahan's widow Jean Carnahan to begin the rest of Mel Carnahan's unexpired Senate term. This was the only time between 1968 and 2020 that the winner of the Missouri gubernatorial election did not come from the same party as the winner of the presidential election held simultaneously. This gubernatorial election was one of the closest in Missouri's history. Bob Holden did well, as expected in St. Louis and Kansas City. Talent easily won most rural parts of the state. Holden did poorly in the St. Louis suburbs. However Holden's overwhelming wins in the Democratic strongholds of St. Louis and Kansas City proved to be just enough to push him over the finish line. Because the election was decided by less than 1%, Talent could have requested a recount that his campaign would have to pay for since it was not below half a percent. However, most recounts never see a swing of more than 1,000 votes, and Talent was trailing by 21,445. Talent ultimately did not request a recount and conceded defeat on the late evening of November 14.

== Montana ==
2000 Montana gubernatorial election
- November 7, 2000
- Turnout: 59.90%▼10.70
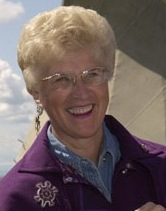

Nominee	Judy Martz	Mark O'Keefe
Party	Republican	Democratic
Running mate	Karl Ohs	Carol Williams
Popular vote	209,135	193,131
Percentage	51.0%	47.1%
- County results Martz: 50–60% 60–70% 70–80% 80–90% O'Keefe: 50–60% 60–70% 70–80%
Governor before election
Marc Racicot
Republican
Elected Governor
Judy Martz
Republican

The 2000 Montana gubernatorial election took place on November 7, 2000. Incumbent governor of Montana Marc Racicot, who was first elected in 1992 and was re-elected in 1996, was unable to seek re-election due to term limits. Judy Martz, the lieutenant governor of Montana under Racicot for four years, won the Republican primary and advanced to the general election, where she faced Mark O'Keefe, the Montana State Auditor and Democratic nominee. Despite the fact that George W. Bush, the Republican nominee for president in 2000, won the state in a landslide, the race between Martz and O'Keefe was close. However, Martz managed to narrowly defeat him to win her first and only term as governor. This was the last time that a Republican was elected Governor of Montana until 2020, when Greg Gianforte was elected.

== New Hampshire ==
2000 New Hampshire gubernatorial election
- November 7, 2000
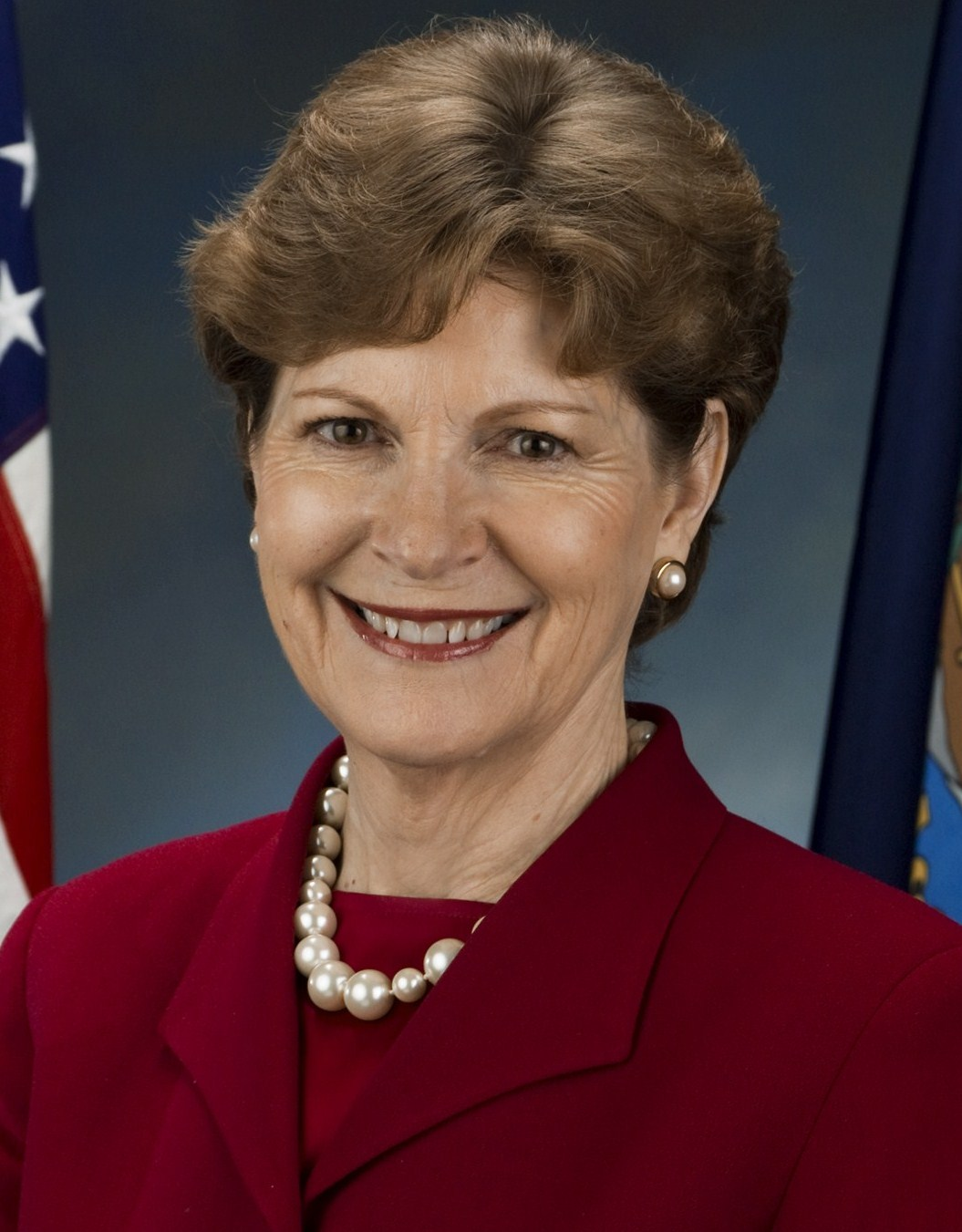

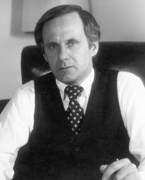

Nominee	Jeanne Shaheen	Gordon Humphrey	Mary Brown
Party	Democratic	Republican	Independent
Popular vote	275,038	246,952	35,904
Percentage	48.8%	43.8%	6.4%
- Shaheen: 40–50% 50–60% 60–70% Humphrey: 40–50% 50–60% 60–70% 70–80% 80–90% >90% Tie: 40–50%
Governor before election
Jeanne Shaheen
Democratic
Elected Governor
Jeanne Shaheen
Democratic

The 2000 New Hampshire gubernatorial election took place on November 7, 2000. Incumbent Democratic Governor Jeanne Shaheen won re-election.

== North Carolina ==
2000 North Carolina gubernatorial election
- November 7, 2000
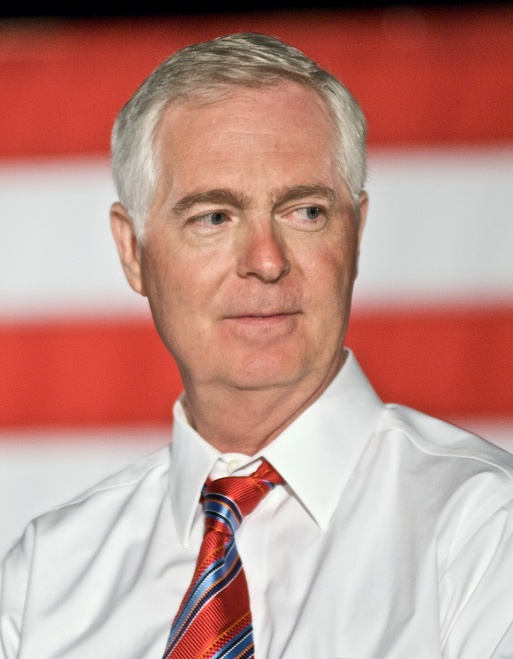

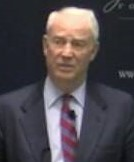
Nominee	Mike Easley	Richard Vinroot
Party	Democratic	Republican
Popular vote	1,530,324	1,360,960
Percentage	52.02%	46.26%
- County results Easley: 40–50% 50–60% 60–70% 70–80% Vinroot: 50–60% 60–70%
Governor before election
Jim Hunt
Democratic
Elected Governor
Mike Easley
Democratic

The 2000 North Carolina gubernatorial election was held on November 7, 2000. The general election was fought between the Republican nominee, former mayor of Charlotte Richard Vinroot and the Democratic nominee, state Attorney General Mike Easley. Easley won by 52% to 46% and succeeded fellow Democrat Jim Hunt as governor.

== North Dakota ==
2000 North Dakota gubernatorial election
- November 7, 2000
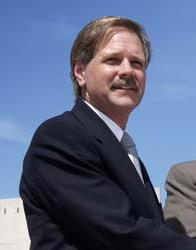

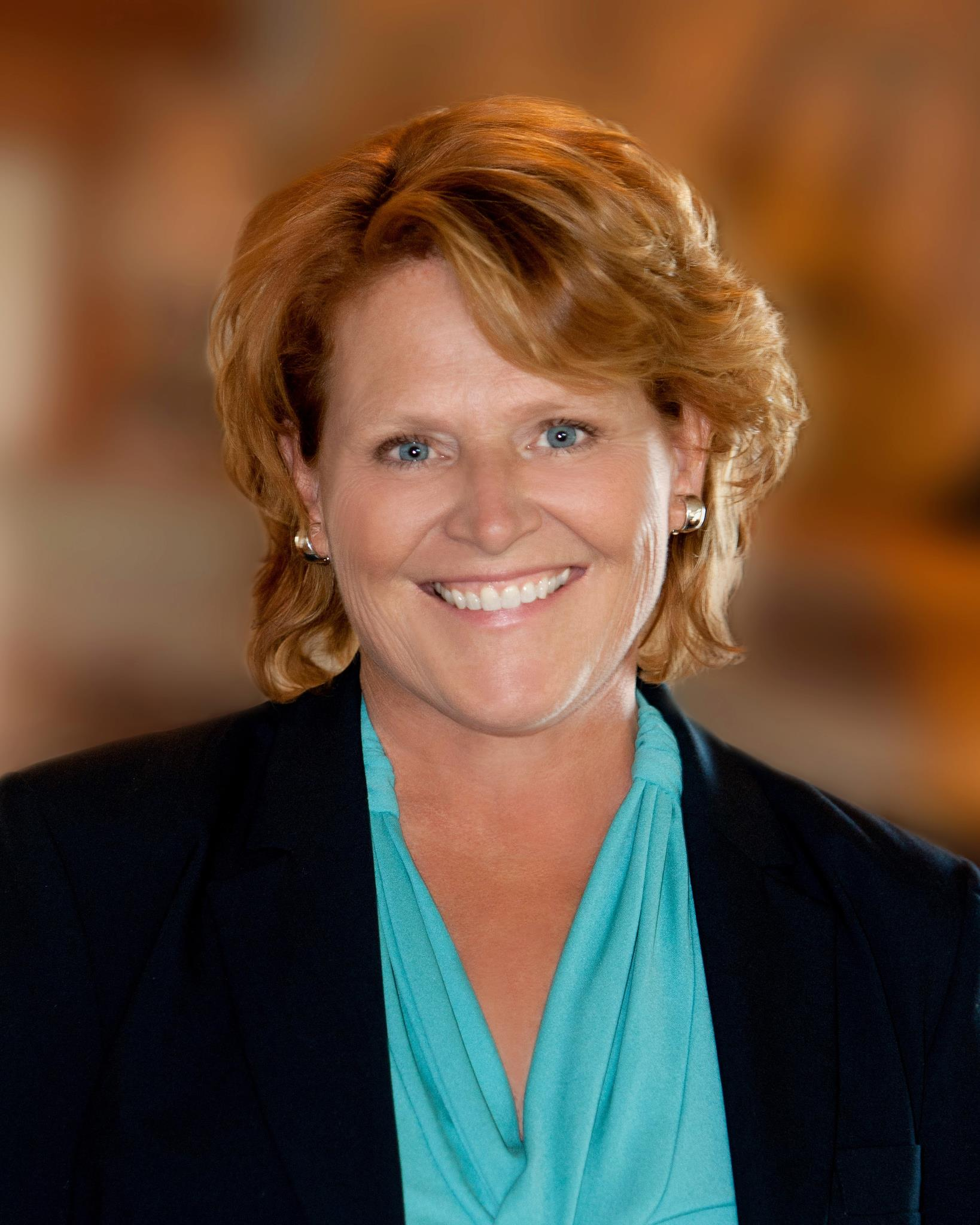
Nominee	John Hoeven	Heidi Heitkamp
Party	Republican	Democratic–NPL
Running mate	Jack Dalrymple	Aaron Krauter
Popular vote	159,255	130,144
Percentage	55.0%	45.0%
- County results Hoeven: 50–60% 60–70% Heitkamp: 50–60% 60–70% 70–80% 80–90%
Governor before election
Ed Schafer
Republican
Elected Governor
John Hoeven
Republican

The 2000 North Dakota gubernatorial election took place on November 7, 2000 for the post of Governor of North Dakota. Incumbent Republican governor Ed Schafer decided not to run for reelection. Republican nominee John Hoeven won the election over Democratic State Attorney General Heidi Heitkamp. Heitkamp had led in the polls until early October, when reports indicated that she had breast cancer, and would undergo surgery. She ran advertisements to assure voters she was still fit to serve; however, by the final month, Hoeven had taken a six-point lead in polling. As of 2021, this is the most recent North Dakota gubernatorial election in which the Democratic nominee received over 40% of the vote. Hoeven and Heitkamp later served alongside each other in the United States Senate from 2013 to 2019.

== Utah ==
2000 Utah gubernatorial election
- November 7, 2000
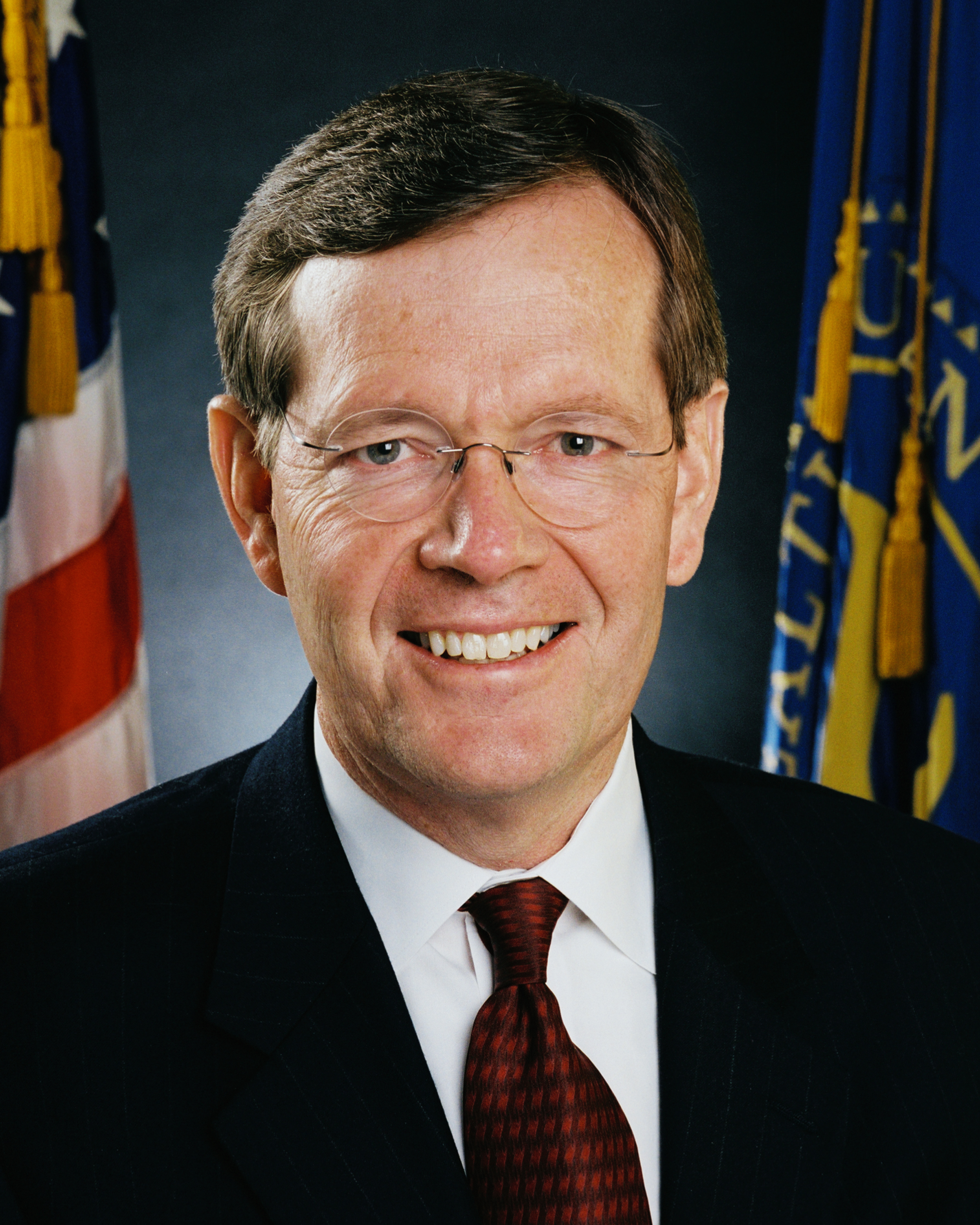

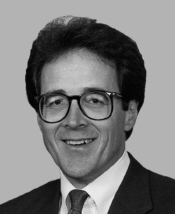
Nominee	Mike Leavitt	Bill Orton
Party	Republican	Democratic
Running mate	Olene Walker	Karen Hale
Popular vote	424,837	321,979
Percentage	55.77%	42.27%
- County results Leavitt: 50–60% 60–70% 70–80% Orton: 50–60% 60–70%
Governor before election
Mike Leavitt
Republican
Elected Governor
Mike Leavitt
Republican

The 2000 Utah gubernatorial election took place on November 7, 2000. Incumbent Republican Mike Leavitt won reelection to a third term.

== Vermont ==
2000 Vermont gubernatorial election
- November 7, 2000
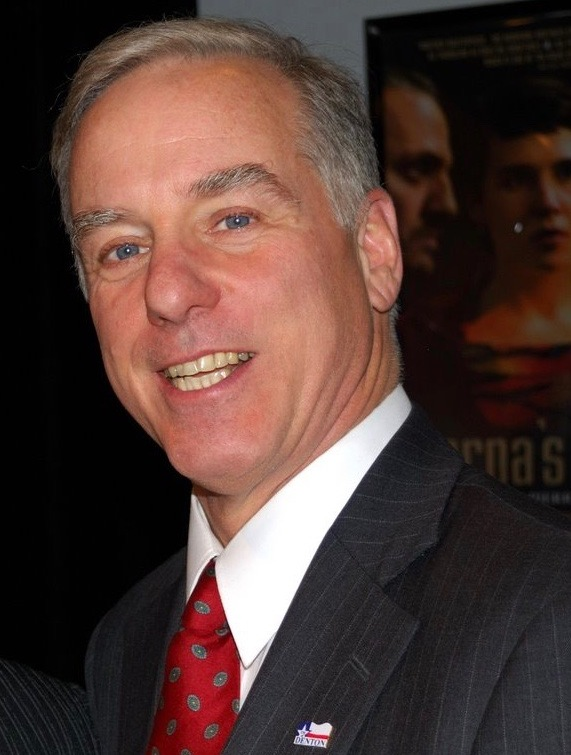

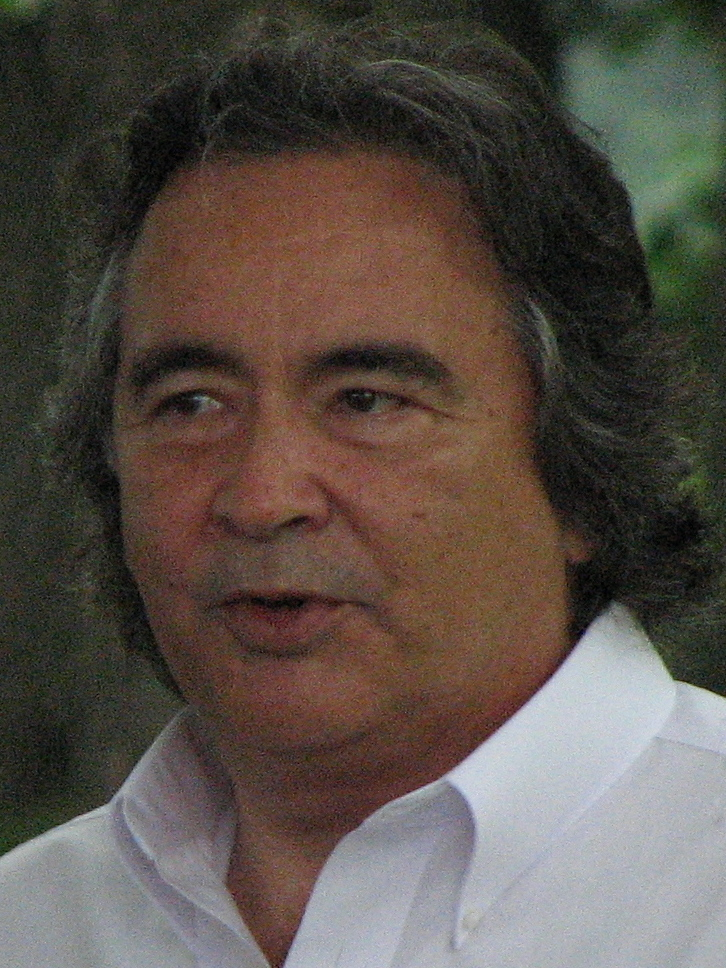
Nominee	Howard Dean	Ruth Dwyer	Anthony Pollina
Party	Democratic	Republican	Progressive
Popular vote	148,059	111,359	28,116
Percentage	50.5%	38.0%	9.6%
- Dean: 30-40% 40-50% 50-60% 60-70% 70-80% 80-90% Dwyer: 30-40% 40-50% 50-60% 60-70% 70-80%
Governor before election
Howard Dean
Democratic
Elected Governor
Howard Dean
Democratic

The 2000 Vermont gubernatorial election took place on November 7, 2000. Incumbent Democratic governor Howard Dean won re-election. The campaign was dominated by the fallout from the passage of a civil union bill and the subsequent backlash encapsulated by the slogan Take Back Vermont. Ruth Dwyer, the Republican nominee in 1998, ran again in 2000 and was closely tied to the Take Back Vermont movement. Howard Dean, the Democratic governor, favored civil unions and was a primary target of Take Back Vermont.

== Washington ==
2000 Washington gubernatorial election
- November 7, 2000
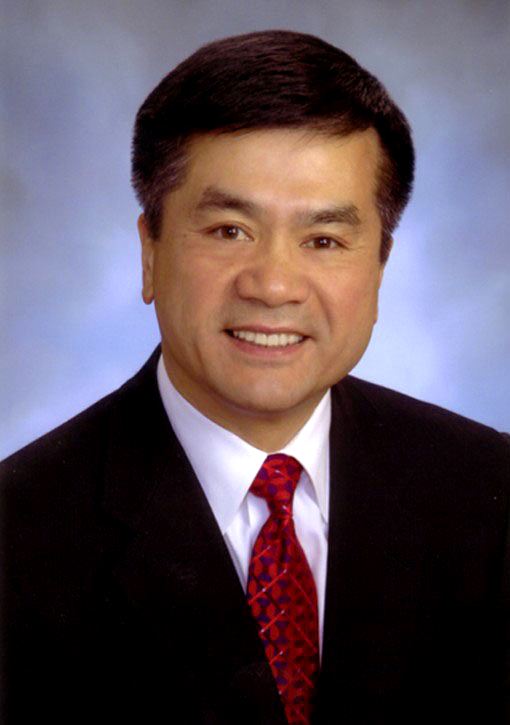

Nominee	Gary Locke	John Carlson
Party	Democratic	Republican
Popular vote	1,441,973	980,060
Percentage	58.4%	39.7%
- County results Locke: 40–50% 50–60% 60–70% Carlson: 40–50% 50–60%
Governor before election
Gary Locke
Democratic
Elected Governor
Gary Locke
Democratic

The 2000 Washington gubernatorial election was held on November 7, 2000. Incumbent Democratic governor Gary Locke defeated the Republican candidate John Carlson for his second term in a landslide.

As of 2022, this was the earliest gubernatorial election in Washington in which both candidates are currently still living. This is the last time a Democratic nominee for governor outperformed the Democratic nominee for president in Washington. This would also be the last gubernatorial election in Washington in which the margin of victory was in double digits and in which any counties in Eastern Washington voted for a Democrat until Jay Inslee's 2020 landslide victory.

== West Virginia ==
2000 West Virginia gubernatorial election
- November 7, 2000
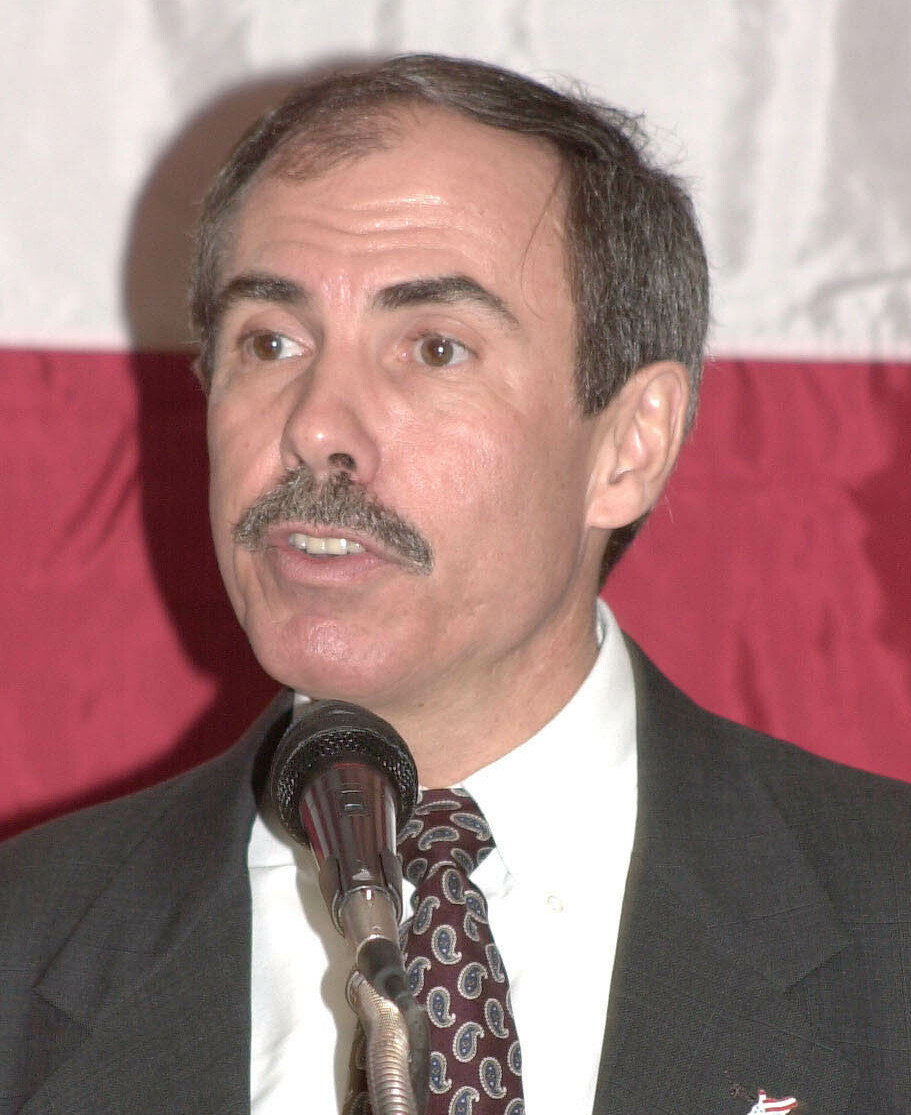

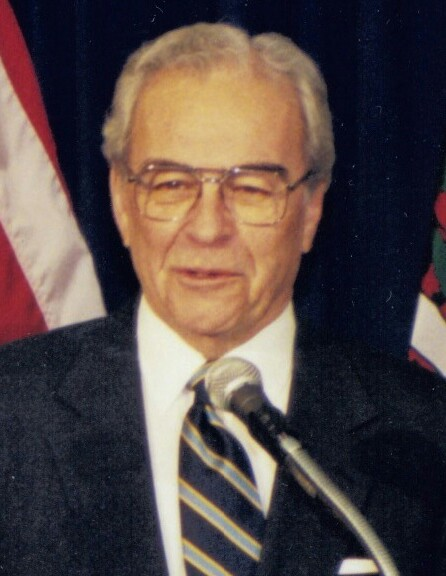
Nominee	Bob Wise	Cecil Underwood
Party	Democratic	Republican
Popular vote	324,822	305,926
Percentage	50.1%	47.2%
- County results Wise: 40–50% 50–60% 60–70% Underwood: 40–50% 50–60% 60–70% 70–80%
Governor before election
Cecil Underwood
Republican
Elected Governor
Bob Wise
Democratic

The 2000 West Virginia gubernatorial election took place on November 7, 2000. Incumbent Republican governor Cecil Underwood ran for re-election to a second consecutive term in office, but was defeated by Democratic U.S. Representative Bob Wise. Concurrently, the state voted for the opposite party federally, choosing Republican nominee, George W. Bush over Democratic nominee Al Gore in the presidential election that year. As of 2022, this was the last time in which an incumbent West Virginia Governor lost re-election.

== Territories ==
=== American Samoa ===
Guam election
Party	Candidate	Votes	%
Democratic	Tauese Sunia	{{{votes}}}	51.4%
Independent	L. Peter Reid	{{{votes}}}	48.6%
Total votes		{{{votes}}}	100.00

=== Puerto Rico ===
2000 Puerto Rican general election
- 7 November 2000
- Turnout: 82.20%
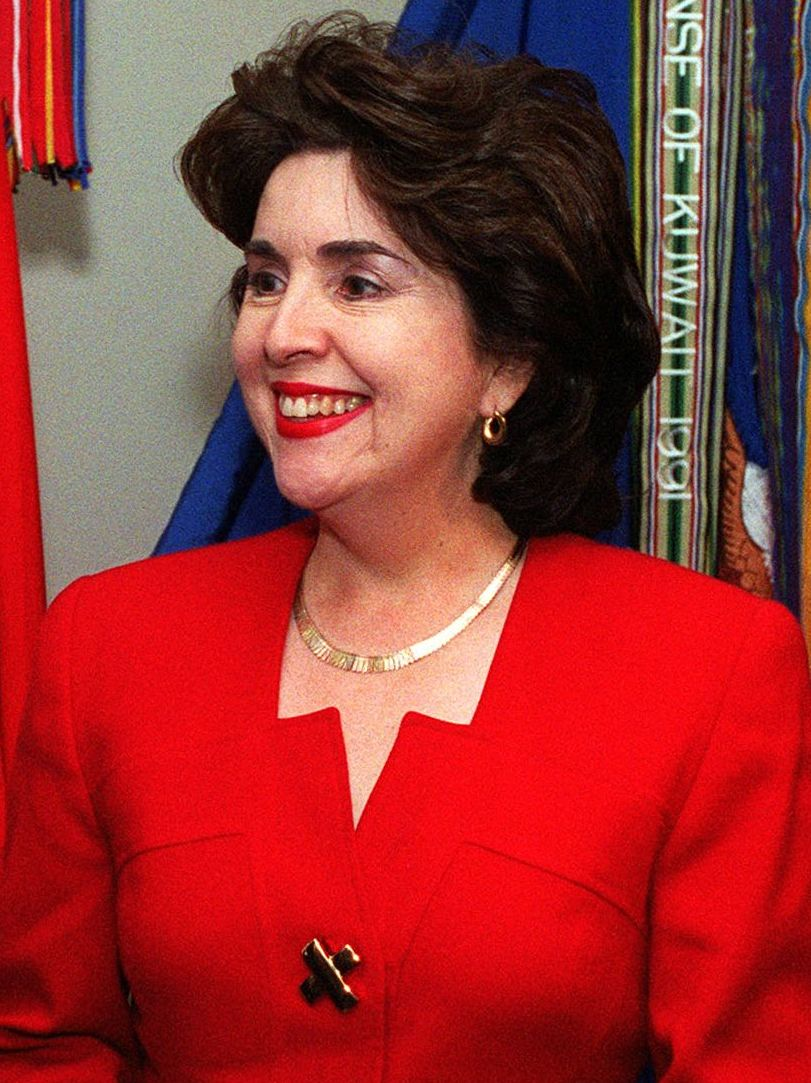

Nominee	Sila María Calderón	Carlos Pesquera	Rubén Berríos
Party	Popular Democratic	New Progressive	Independence
Alliance	Democratic	Democratic
Popular vote	978,860	919,194	104,705
Percentage	48.9%	45.9%	5.7%
- Results by municipality Calderón: 40-50% 50-60% Pesquera: 40–50% 50–60%
Governor before election
Pedro Rosselló
New Progressive
Elected Governor
Sila María Calderón
Popular Democratic

== See also ==
- 2000 United States elections
  - 2000 United States presidential election
  - 2000 United States Senate elections
  - 2000 United States House of Representatives elections
