= 16th district =

16th district may refer to:

== France ==
- 16th arrondissement of Marseille
- 16th arrondissement of Paris

== United States ==
=== Congressional districts ===
- California's 16th congressional district
- Florida's 16th congressional district
- Illinois's 16th congressional district
- Massachusetts's 16th congressional district
- Michigan's 16th congressional district
- Missouri's 16th congressional district
- New York's 16th congressional district
- Ohio's 16th congressional district
- Pennsylvania's 16th congressional district
- Texas's 16th congressional district
- Virginia's 16th congressional district

=== State districts ===
- California's 16th State Senate district
- 16th Legislative District (New Jersey)
- Pennsylvania House of Representatives, District 16
- Pennsylvania Senate, District 16
- Texas Senate, District 16
- 16th Utah Senate District
- Virginia Senate, District 16
- Wisconsin Senate, District 16
