= Ruth Dwyer =

Ruth Dwyer may refer to:

- Ruth Dwyer (politician)
- Ruth Dwyer (actress)
