= Senator Snow =

Olympia Snowe (born 1947), was a U.S. Senator from Maine from 1995 to 2013. Senator Snow or Snowe may also refer to:

- John J. Snow Jr. (1945–2026), North Carolina State Senate
- Karl N. Snow (1930–2024), Utah State Senate
- Leslie Perkins Snow (1862–1934), New Hampshire State Senate
- Lois Snowe-Mello (1948–2016), Maine State Senate
