= Ross I. Romero =

American politician

Member of the Utah Senate from the 7th district
- In office 2006–2012
- Preceded by: Karen Hale
- Succeeded by: Deidre Henderson

Member of the Utah House of Representatives from the 25th district
- In office 2004–2006
- Succeeded by: Christine Johnson

Personal details
- Born: November 13, 1971 (age 54) Pueblo, Colorado, U.S.
- Party: Democratic
- Spouse: Cecilia
- Education: University of Utah (BA); University of Michigan (JD)
- Occupation: Attorney

Ross I. Romero (born November 13, 1971) is an American politician and attorney from Utah. A Democrat, he was a member of the Utah State Senate, representing the state's 7th senate district in Salt Lake County including the East Bench of Salt Lake City. He was also the Senate Democratic Leader.

== Early life and education ==
Romero was born in Pueblo, Colorado and moved to Utah with his parents when he was two years old. His mother, Anita Bruce, was an elementary school teacher. After his parents divorced, Ross moved to West Valley City, Utah with his mother and step-father.

He graduated from Highland High School in 1989 and graduated from the University of Utah with a degree in political science. As a college student, he served participated in an internship program through the Hinckley Institute of Politics. Romero then earned a Juris Doctor from the University of Michigan Law School.

== Career ==
Romero accepted a job with the law firm Jones Waldo, where he focused on business litigation. He eventually becomes a partner in 2003. In 2007, Ross accepted a job with Zions Bank in their Government Relations office.

Romero has served as a member of the Salt Lake City Board of Adjustment, board member of University of Utah Young Alumni Board, a Salt Shaker with the Salt Lake Area Chamber of Commerce, and a board member of the Utah Hispanic Chamber of Commerce. He became President of the Utah Minority Bar Association in 2003.

=== Utah Legislature ===
In 2004, Romero was elected as a Representative in the Utah House of Representatives. When a vacancy in his Senate district became available in 2006, Ross was asked to run for the State Senate, where he was reelected in 2010.

During his Senate career, Romero was known as a champion for education, the environment, equality, and good government. Various interest groups rated Ross positively with 100% scores, including the Sierra Club, Equality Utah, and Utah Education Association.

In November 2010, Romero was elected as Senate Minority Leader by his Democratic colleagues.

=== 2012 mayoral campaign ===
Romero became a candidate for Salt Lake County Mayor in September 2011. He focused on the environment, education, and economic development. He lost the race for his party's nomination to Ben McAdams.

Utah State Senate election Dis. 7, 2006
Party	Candidate	Votes	%	±%
Republican	Bryce Jolley	9,950	34.3	
Democratic	Ross Romero	18,589	64.1	

== Personal life ==
Romero was born in Pueblo, Colorado and grew up in West Valley City, Utah. He graduated from Highland High School, where he started a Young Democrats club.

Romero met his wife, Cecilia, while studying at the University of Michigan. After graduating from law school in 1996, the couple decided that they wanted to start their family in Salt Lake County, Utah.
