= Howard C. Nielson Jr. =

American judge (born 1968)

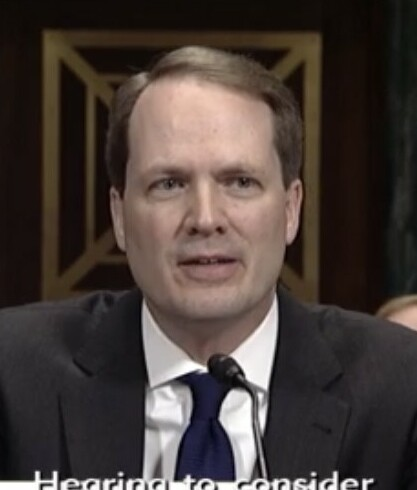

Judge of the United States District Court for the District of Utah
- Incumbent
- Assumed office June 12, 2019
- Appointed by: Donald Trump
- Preceded by: Ted Stewart

Personal details
- Born: 1968 (age 57–58) Provo, Utah, U.S.
- Relations: Howard C. Nielson (father)
- Education: Brigham Young University (BA); University of Chicago (JD)

Howard Curtis Nielson Jr. (born 1968) is a United States district judge of the United States District Court for the District of Utah.

== Biography ==
Nielson was born in 1968 to Julia (née Adams) and Howard C. Nielson, who was a member of the Utah House of Representatives. When he was 14, his father was elected to the United States House of Representatives. Nielson received his Bachelor of Arts with university honors and summa cum laude from Brigham Young University and his J.D. degree with high honors from the University of Chicago Law School, where he was elected to Order of the Coif and served as articles editor of the University of Chicago Law Review.

Earlier in his career, he served as a law clerk to Judge J. Michael Luttig of the United States Court of Appeals for the Fourth Circuit and then to Justice Anthony Kennedy of the Supreme Court of the United States. From 2001 to 2005, Nielson served in the United States Department of Justice, first as counsel to the Attorney General and later as Deputy Assistant Attorney General in the Office of Legal Counsel. He has taught courses in constitutional litigation, national security law, foreign relations law, and federal courts as a Distinguished Lecturer at the J. Reuben Clark Law School at Brigham Young University.

=== Federal judicial service ===
On September 28, 2017, President Donald Trump nominated Nielson to serve as a United States district judge of the United States District Court for the District of Utah, to the seat vacated by Judge Ted Stewart, who assumed senior status on September 1, 2014. A hearing on his nomination before the Senate Judiciary Committee was held on January 10, 2018. On February 8, 2018, Nielson’s nomination was reported out of committee by an 11–10 vote. Democrats on the committee opposed Nielson over his role in defending California's Proposition 8 and his role in reviewing two torture memos in 2004 and 2006 when he was serving as a deputy assistant general at the Office of Legal Counsel for the Justice Department. On March 6, 2018, Illinois Senator Tammy Duckworth put a hold on his nomination.

On January 3, 2019, his nomination was returned to the President under Rule XXXI, Paragraph 6 of the United States Senate. On January 23, 2019, President Trump announced his intent to renominate Nielson for a federal judgeship. His nomination was sent to the Senate later that day. On February 7, 2019, his nomination was reported out of committee by a 12–10 vote. On May 21, 2019, the Senate invoked cloture on his nomination by a 52–47 vote. On May 22, 2019, his nomination was confirmed by a 51–47 vote, with Susan Collins voting against his nomination. He received his judicial commission on June 12, 2019.

== Memberships ==
He was a member of the Federalist Society from 1997 to 2007.

== See also ==
- Donald Trump judicial appointment controversies
- List of law clerks for the first seat of the Supreme Court of the United States

Legal offices
Preceded by Ted Stewart	Judge of the United States District Court for the District of Utah; 2019–present	Incumbent
