= Deidre Henderson =

American politician (born 1974)

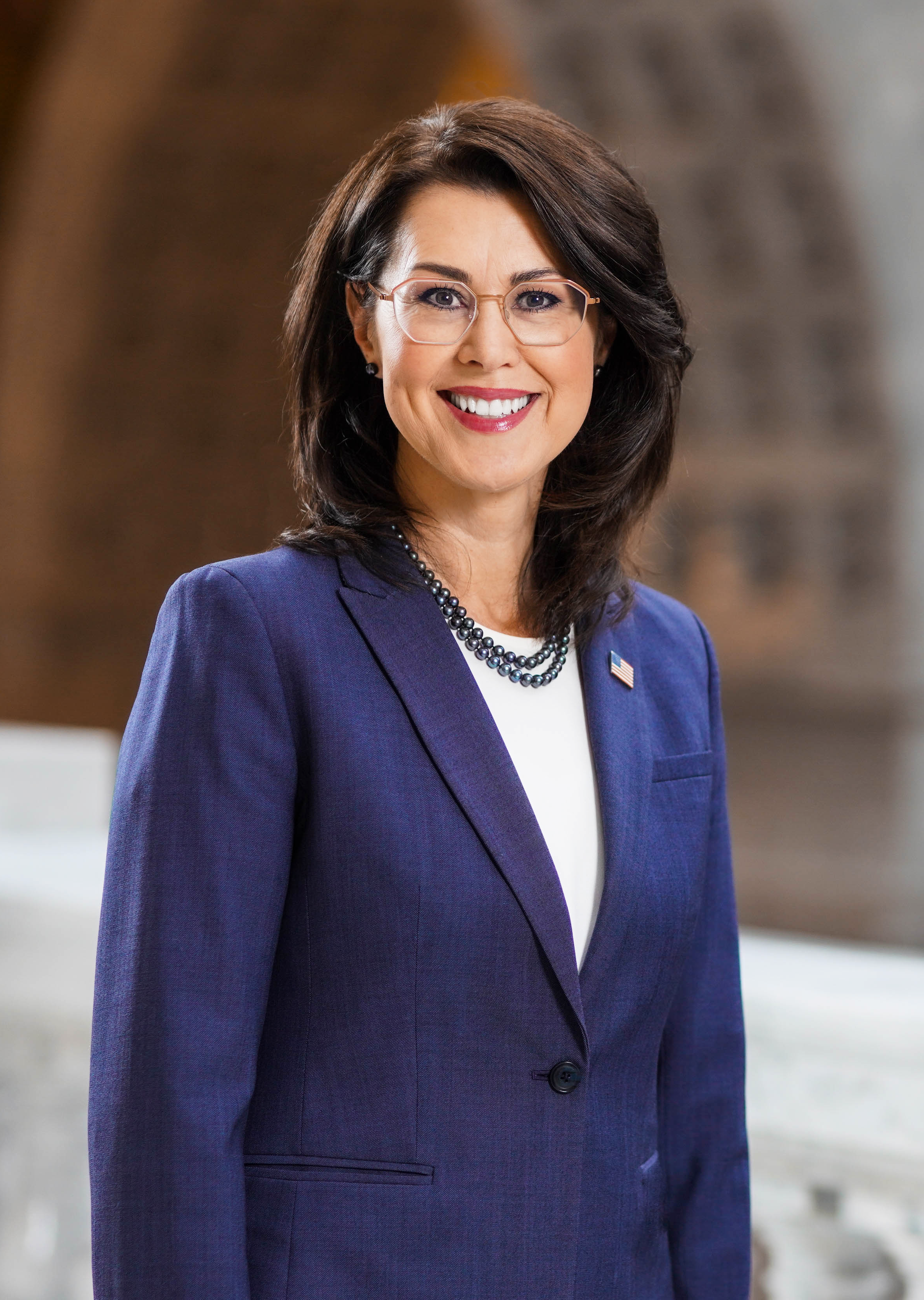

9th Lieutenant Governor of Utah
- Incumbent
- Assumed office January 4, 2021
- Governor: Spencer Cox
- Preceded by: Spencer Cox

Member of the Utah State Senate from the 7th district
- In office January 1, 2013 – January 1, 2021
- Preceded by: Ross I. Romero
- Succeeded by: Mike McKell

Personal details
- Born: Deidre Marie Ellingford; September 4, 1974 (age 52) Netherlands
- Party: Republican
- Spouse: Gabe Henderson
- Children: 5
- Education: Brigham Young University (BA)
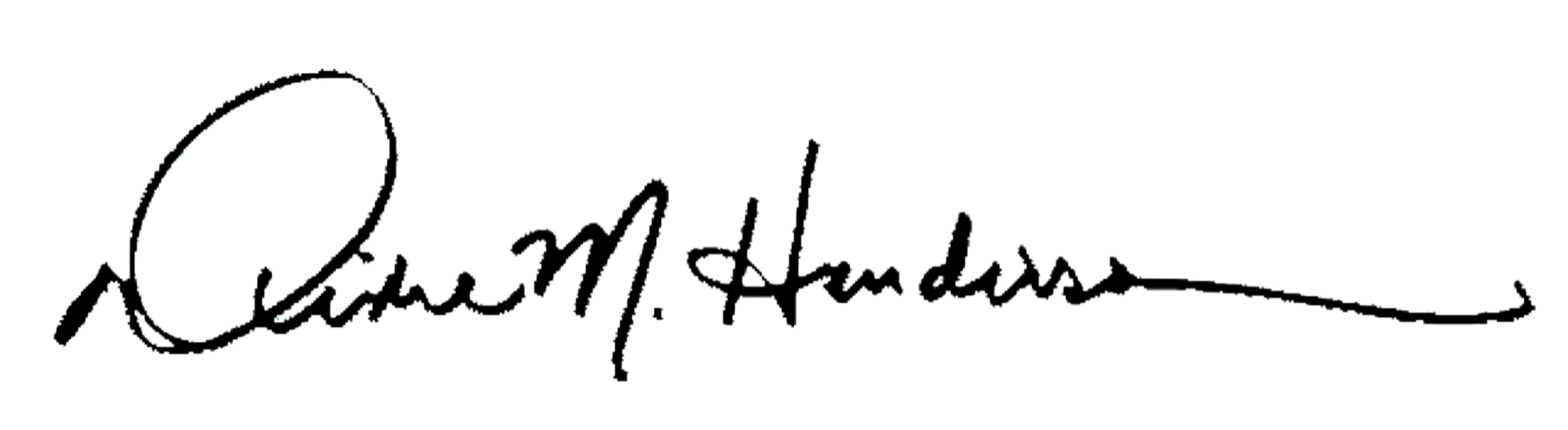
- Signature

Deidre Marie Henderson (born September 4, 1974) is an American politician serving as the ninth lieutenant governor of Utah since 2021. She previously served as a member of the Utah State Senate for the 7th district, which is based in Spanish Fork, Utah, from 2013 to 2021.

== Early life and education ==
Deidre Marie Ellingford was born on September 4, 1974, in the Netherlands into a military family and spent her early childhood there before moving to the United States. She is the daughter of Craig Ellingford and Cathryn Harward; her parents later divorced, and her mother married Rodney Hulse. Henderson was raised in Colorado, Minnesota, and Taylorsville, Utah. Following her graduation, she moved to Hartford, Connecticut, before attended Brigham Young University for her freshman year. Henderson left BYU in 1994, after getting married and starting a family.

In 2014, while serving in the state senate, she began pursuing a bachelor's degree in history from Brigham Young University, which she continued after becoming lieutenant governor. She was able to earn course credits by completing an internship in the lieutenant governor's office, with Governor Spencer Cox listed as her supervisor. She graduated from BYU in December 2021.

== Career ==
Before joining the Utah State Senate, Henderson worked as a business consultant and was involved in U.S. Congressman Jason Chaffetz's 2008 campaign.

Henderson started her political career working for the Jason Chaffetz election campaign. In 2012, Henderson was selected from two candidates in the Republican convention and ran unopposed for the state senate in the November 6, 2012 general election, winning with 27,257 votes. The district formerly consisted of the East Bench and was held by Democratic Senator Ross I. Romero, who retired in 2012. The Utah State Legislature's 2012 redistricting plan moved the 7th district from the Salt Lake Valley to the southern portion of Utah County.

Henderson was sworn into office in January 2013. In 2016, she was re-elected, defeating her Democratic opponent, Andrew Apsley, with 83.65% of the vote to Apsley's 16.35%.

Henderson ran to represent Utah's 3rd congressional district in 2017. Henderson lost to State Representative Chris Herrod in the Republican convention.

=== Lieutenant governor of Utah ===
On March 19, 2020, Henderson was selected as the running mate of incumbent lieutenant governor Spencer Cox in the 2020 Utah gubernatorial election Republican primary. After Cox won the Republican primary, Henderson became the Republican nominee for lieutenant governor. She was sworn in as lieutenant governor on January 4, 2021.

In 2024, Henderson endorsed Nikki Haley's presidential campaign. After the 2024 primary, Henderson refused to endorse Donald Trump.

==== 2025–26 voter records lawsuit ====
In 2025, the federal Justice Department sent a letter to Henderson (in her official capacity as Utah’s "chief election official") requesting a full, unredacted list of all registered voters in the state. She instead provided the public, redacted list. Her refusal led the Department to file a lawsuit in February 2026, alleging that her refusal to provide the unredacted list violated the Civil Rights Act of 1960. Similar lawsuits were filed against 29 other states and the District of Columbia. Henderson petitioned for dismissal, citing privacy laws that she said obligated her to protect voters’ personal information. The Department also informed Henderson in September 2026 that she was “under investigation” for her refusal to provide the voter rolls, stating that it may constitute “spoliation of evidence” and could lead to “civil and criminal sanctions." Ultimately, the civil lawsuit against Henderson was dismissed with prejudice by a federal judge in October.

Henderson received national attention for her continued refusal to hand over voters' private information. In an interview on 60 Minutes, she told interviewer Lesley Stahl that while previous elections during her tenure had only faced “external” threats like “non-state actors [and] cyber security threats, … now we also have threats coming from within our own government.”

== Personal life ==
Henderson is married Gabe Henderson, a physical therapist from Wilmington, North Carolina. They have five children. She is a member of the Church of Jesus Christ of Latter-day Saints.

Utah State Senate
Preceded by Ross I. Romero	Member of the Utah State Senate from the 7th district 2013–2021	Succeeded by Mike McKell
Political offices
Preceded by Spencer Cox	Lieutenant Governor of Utah; 2021–present	Incumbent
