= Jim Nielson =

American politician

Member of the Utah House of Representatives from the 19th district
- In office January 2010 – January 2015
- Preceded by: Sheryl Allen
- Succeeded by: Raymond Ward

Personal details
- Born: James Nielson
- Party: Republican
- Spouse: Marilyn Nielson
- Relations: Howard C. Nielson (father)
- Children: 5
- Education: Brigham Young University (BA); University of Oregon (MArch)

James "Jim" Nielson is an American politician and architect who served as a member of the Utah House of Representatives for the 19th district from January 2010 to January 2015.

== Early life and education ==
Nielson is the son of former U.S. Representative Howard C. Nielson. He earned a Bachelor of Arts degree in English from Brigham Young University and Master of Architecture from the University of Oregon.

== Career ==
He was originally elected in 2010 to fill the seat vacated by Sheryl Allen. He ran against Ben Horsley in the Republican primary in 2010, and then defeated Democrat Richard Watson in the November general election. He was subsequently re-elected as an incumbent in 2012, when he did not face a Republican challenger and defeated Democrat Lynn Anderson by a significant margin. In 2008, Nielson ran for Utah State Senate, but was defeated by Dan Liljenquist in the convention. Nielson served in the Reagan administration in the United States Department of Education from 1983 to 1988.

Nielson's sponsored the 2012 State Constitutional Amendment A, which passed the house by a majority and the senate unanimously. It was approved by a slight majority in November 2012. This legislation closed a loophole which the legislature had been using to spend this money each year, and requires the state to save a certain portion of severance taxes (oil and gas) in a permanent fund. During the 2013 and 2014 legislative sessions, Nielson served on the Public Education Appropriations Subcommittee, the House Education Committee, and the House Revenue and Taxation Committee. During the interim, Nielson served on the Education Interim Committee and the Revenue and Taxation Interim Committee.

Since retiring from the legislature, Nielson has worked as an architect in Salt Lake City for Axis Architects.

== Personal life ==
He is married to Marilyn Nielson, and has five children.
