= 2000 Vermont gubernatorial election =

- November 7, 2000
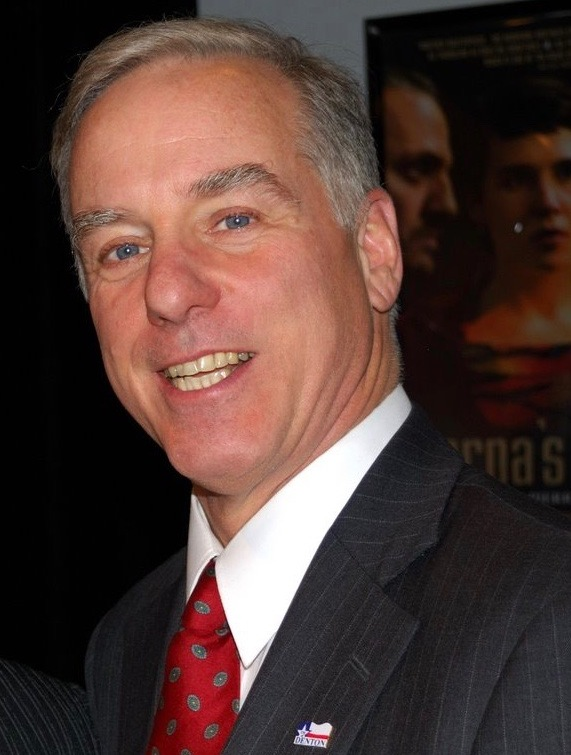

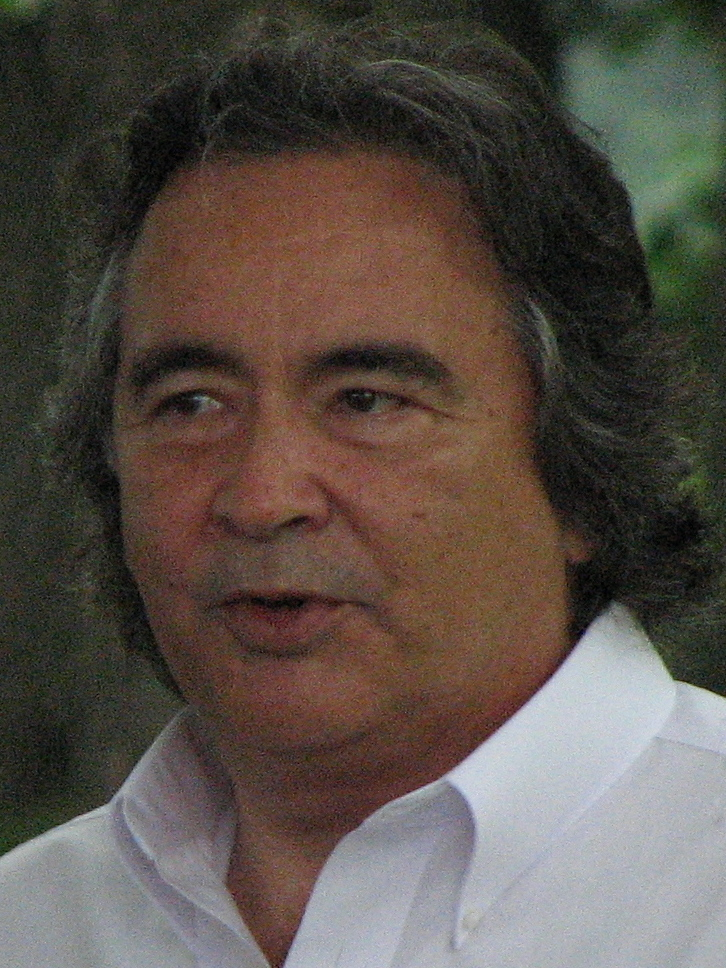
Nominee	Howard Dean	Ruth Dwyer	Anthony Pollina
Party	Democratic	Republican	Progressive
Popular vote	148,059	111,359	28,116
Percentage	50.45%	37.95%	9.58%
- Dean: 30–40% 40–50% 50–60% 60–70% 70–80% 80–90% Dwyer: 30–40% 40–50% 50–60% 60–70% 70–80%
Governor before election
Howard Dean
Democratic
Elected Governor
Howard Dean
Democratic

The 2000 Vermont gubernatorial election took place on November 7, 2000. Democratic incumbent Howard Dean was re-elected to a sixth term in office over Ruth Dwyer and Anthony Pollina. Dean narrowly won a majority of the vote by 0.45 percent of the total vote, avoiding a contingent election in the Vermont General Assembly.

The campaign was dominated by fallout from the passage of a civil union bill and subsequent backlash, encapsulated by the slogan Take Back Vermont. Ruth Dwyer, the 1998 Republican nominee, ran again and was closely tied to the Take Back Vermont movement, which targeted Dean over his support for civil unions.

== Democratic primary ==
=== Candidates ===
- Howard Dean, incumbent governor since 1991
- Brian Pearl

=== Results ===
Democratic Primary results
Party	Candidate	Votes	%
Democratic	Howard Dean (incumbent)	31,366	84.39
Democratic	Brian Pearl	4,357	11.72
Democratic	Write-ins	1,446	3.89
Total votes		37,169	100.00

== Republican primary ==
=== Candidates ===
- Ruth Dwyer, former state representative from Bradford and 1998 gubernatorial nominee
- William Meub

=== Results ===
Republican primary results
Party	Candidate	Votes	%
Republican	Ruth Dwyer	46,611	57.85
Republican	William Meub	33,105	41.09
Republican	Write-ins	855	1.06
Total votes		80,571	100.00

== Progressive nomination ==
The Vermont Progressive Party unanimously selected to give its nomination to Anthony Pollina on February 13, 2000. Elizabeth Skarie, the wife of Jerry Greenfield, also sought the nomination.

== General election ==
=== Candidates ===
- Marilyn Verna Christian (Independent)
- Howard Dean, incumbent governor since 1991 (Democratic)
- Ruth Dwyer, former state representative from Bradford and 1998 gubernatorial nominee (Republican)
- Richard F. Gottlieb (Liberty Union)
- Hardy Macia (Libertarian)
- Anthony Pollina, activist and perennial candidate (Progressive)
- Phil Stannard Sr. (Independent)
- Joel W. Williams (Grassroots)

=== Debates ===
- Complete video of debate, September 24, 2000

=== Polling ===
Poll source	Date(s)	Sample size	Margin of error	Howard Dean (D)	Ruth Dwyer (R)	Anthony Pollina (P)	Other / undecided (Note: Calculated by taking the difference of 100% and all other listed candidates combined. For polls that do not report a figure for Pollina, this includes his support.)
Rasmussen Reports	October 26, 2000	1,000	—	46%	39%	—	15%
Research 2000	October 24, 2000	400	—	49%	35%	7%	9%
Mason-Dixon Polling & Strategy	October 19, 2000	628	—	48%	39%	6%	7%

=== Results ===
Pollina's candidacy nearly succeeded in holding Dean to less than 50 percent, which would have required the Vermont General Assembly to choose a winner. In such races, the joint meeting of the Vermont House and Senate almost always chooses the candidate who received the highest number of votes, but Republicans took control of the Vermont House of Representatives, which might have resulted in a contested election.

2000 Vermont gubernatorial election
Party	Candidate	Votes	%	±%
Democratic	Howard Dean (incumbent)	148,059	50.45%	−5.22%
Republican	Ruth Dwyer	111,359	37.95%	−3.19%
Progressive	Anthony Pollina	28,116	9.58%	N/A
Independent	Phil Stannard, Sr.	2,148	0.73%	N/A
Grassroots	Joel W. Williams	1,359	0.46%	−1.05%
Independent	Marilyn Verna Christian	1,054	0.36%	N/A
Libertarian	Hardy Macia	785	0.27%	−0.71%
Liberty Union	Richard F. Gottlieb	337	0.11%	−0.42%
Write-in		256	0.09%	N/A
Majority		36,700	12.51%	−2.03%
Turnout		293,473		
Democratic hold		Swing		

==== Results by county ====
County	Howard Dean Democratic		Ruth Dwyer Republican		Anthony Pollina Progressive		Various candidates		Margin		Total votes cast
County	#	%	#	%	#	%	#	%	#	%	Total votes cast
Addison	9,388	54.0%	6,097	35.1%	1,578	9.1%	331	1.9%	3,291	18.9%	17,394
Bennington	8,312	47.3%	7,658	43.6%	1,085	6.2%	504	2.9%	654	3.7%	17,559
Caledonia	5,399	39.6%	6,389	46.9%	1,644	12.1%	191	1.4%	-990	-7.3%	13,623
Chittenden	41,599	58.0%	22,425	31.3%	6,901	9.6%	736	1.0%	19,174	26.7%	71,661
Essex	891	30.9%	1,671	58.0%	214	7.4%	103	3.6%	-780	-27.1%	2,879
Franklin	8,318	43.3%	8,815	45.9%	1,818	9.5%	243	1.3%	-497	-2.6%	19,194
Grand Isle	1,659	45.5%	1,596	43.8%	327	9.0%	66	1.8%	63	2.3%	3,648
Lamoille	5,577	49.4%	4,164	36.9%	1,381	12.2%	162	1.4%	1,413	12.5%	11,284
Orange	6,905	47.0%	6,514	44.3%	1,063	7.2%	209	1.4%	391	2.7%	14,691
Orleans	4,403	36.3%	6,004	49.5%	1,566	12.9%	163	1.4%	-1,601	-13.2%	12,136
Rutland	13,039	44.5%	12,551	42.8%	2,082	7.1%	1,637	5.6%	488	1.7%	29,309
Washington	14,935	50.3%	10,437	35.1%	3,919	13.2%	404	1.4%	4,498	15.2%	29,695
Windham	11,085	51.8%	7,245	33.9%	2,513	11.8%	541	2.5%	3,840	17.9%	21,384
Windsor	16,549	57.0%	9,793	33.8%	2,025	7.0%	649	2.2%	6,756	23.2%	29,016
Totals	148,059	50.5%	111,359	37.9%	28,116	9.6%	5,939	2.0%	36,700	12.6%	293,473

Counties that flipped from Republican to Democratic

- Bennington (largest municipality: Bennington)
- Grand Isle (largest municipality: Alburgh)

Counties that flipped from Democratic to Republican

- Franklin (largest municipality: St. Albans)

== See also ==
- 2000 United States Senate election in Vermont
- 2000 United States House of Representatives election in Vermont
- 2000 United States presidential election in Vermont
