= Utah's 16th State Senate district =

American legislative district

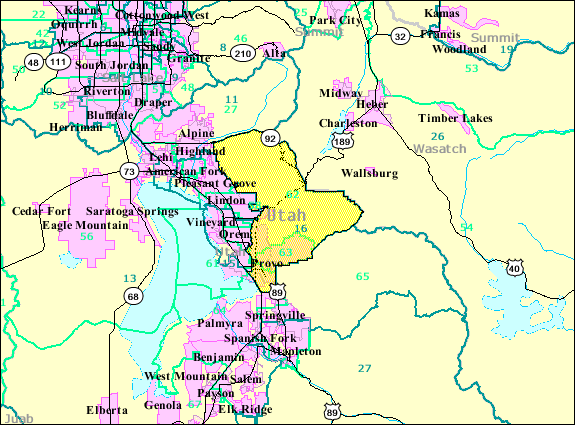
Map of the 16th Utah Senate District.

The 16th Utah Senate District is located in Provo, Utah and includes Utah House Districts 61, 62, 63, and 64. The current State Senator representing the 16th district is Curt Bramble. Bramble was elected to the Utah Senate in 2000 and was up for re-election in 2020. His opponent was Sylvia Andrew.

== Previous Utah State Senators (District 16) ==
Name	Party	Term
Howard C. Nielson	Republican	1997–2001
Charles H. Stewart	Republican	1993–1997
C.E. Peterson	Republican	1985–1992
Karl N. Snow	Republican	1973–1984
Dean C. Christensen	Republican	1971–1972
Richard A. Call	Republican	1967–1970
Leland Sowards	Democratic	1961–1965
Briant H. Stringham	Republican	1957–1959

== Election results ==
=== 2008 General Election ===
Utah State Senate election, 2008
Party	Candidate	Votes	%	±%
Republican	Curt Bramble	11,717	61.57	
Democratic	Radene Hatfield	7,314	38.43	

=== 2004 General Election ===
Utah State Senate election, 2004
Party	Candidate	Votes	%	±%
Republican	Curt Bramble	15,778	76.8	
Democratic	Fred D. Posorio	4,227	20.6	
Libertarian	Brady Fackrell	535	2.6	

=== Current Candidates ===
Note: See footnote for candidate listing guidelines.

== See also ==
- Curtis S. Bramble
- Sylvia Andrew
- RaDene Hatfield
- Utah Democratic Party
- Utah Republican Party
- Utah Senate
