= 2000 Utah gubernatorial election =

- November 7, 2000
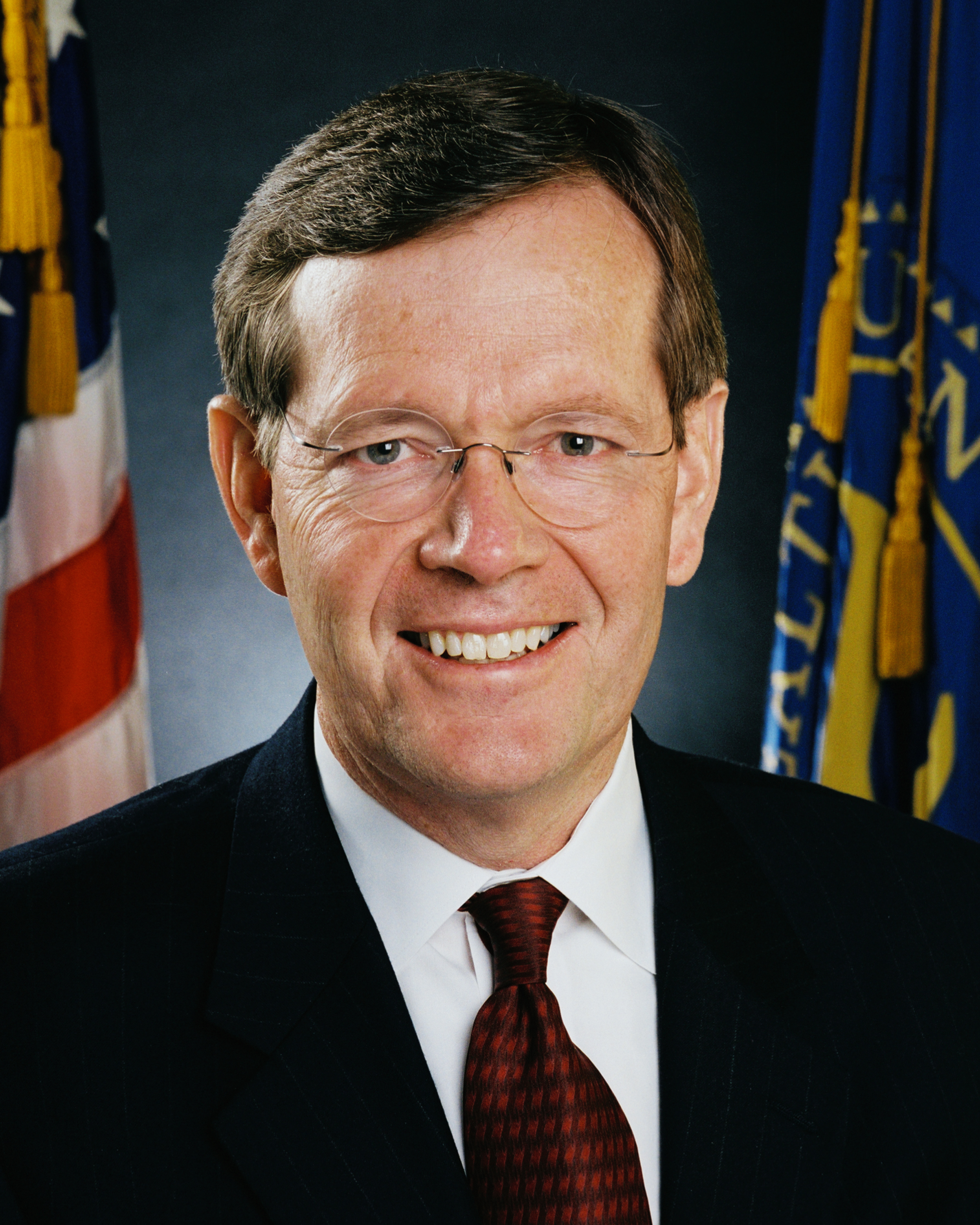

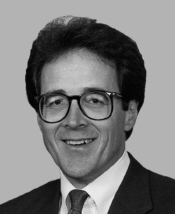
Nominee	Mike Leavitt	Bill Orton
Party	Republican	Democratic
Running mate	Olene Walker	Karen Hale
Popular vote	424,837	321,979
Percentage	55.77%	42.27%
- County results Leavitt: 50–60% 60–70% 70–80% Orton: 50–60% 60–70%
Governor before election
Mike Leavitt
Republican
Elected Governor
Mike Leavitt
Republican

The 2000 Utah gubernatorial election took place on November 7, 2000. Republican incumbent Mike Leavitt was re-elected to a third term over Bill Orton.

Primary elections were held on June 27, 2000. Leavitt defeated a challenge from Glen Davis. Orton won the Democratic Party nomination without opposition.

== Republican primary ==
=== Candidates ===
- Glen Davis
- Mike Leavitt, incumbent governor since 1993

=== Results ===
Republican primary results
Party	Candidate	Votes	%
Republican	Mike Leavitt	122,289	61.76%
Republican	Glen Davis	75,719	38.24%
Total votes		198,008	100.00%

== Democratic primary ==
=== Candidates ===
- Bill Orton, former U.S. representative from Provo

=== Results ===
Bill Orton, a former representative from Utah's 3rd congressional district, was nominated without opposition.

== General election ==
=== Candidates ===
- Jeremy Friedbaum (Independent American)
- Mike Leavitt, incumbent governor since 1993 (Republican)
- Bill Orton, former U.S. representative from Provo (Democratic)

=== Debates ===
- Complete video of debate, October 1, 2000
- Complete video of debate, October 12, 2000
- Complete video of debate, October 16, 2000
- Complete video of debate, October 19, 2000

=== Polling ===
Poll source	Date(s)	Sample size	Margin of error	Mike Leavitt (R)	Bill Orton (D)	Other / undecided (Note: Calculated by taking the difference of 100% and all other candidates combined.)
Harris Insights & Analytics	November 3, 2000	1,643	—	55%	41%	4%
Rasmussen Reports	October 24, 2000	918	—	55%	37%	8%

=== Results ===
2000 Utah gubernatorial election
Party	Candidate	Votes	%	±%
Republican	Mike Leavitt	424,837	55.77%	−19.20%
Democratic	Bill Orton	321,979	42.27%	+18.96%
Independent American	Jeremy Friedbaum	14,990	1.97%	+1.26%
Total votes		761,806	100.00%	
Majority		102,858	13.50%	
Republican hold		Swing	-38.16%	

==== Results by county ====
County	Mike Leavitt Republican		Bill Orton Democratic		Jeremy Friedbaum Independent American		Margin		Total votes cast
County	#	%	#	%	#	%	#	%	Total votes cast
Beaver	1,396	62.66%	798	35.82%	34	1.53%	598	26.84%	2,228
Box Elder	9,910	64.81%	5,107	33.40%	275	1.80%	4,803	31.41%	15,292
Cache	23,949	73.30%	8,264	25.29%	458	1.40%	15.685	48.01%	32,671
Carbon	2,566	35.23%	4,630	63.56%	88	1.21%	-2,064	-28.34%	7,284
Daggett	246	58.16%	175	41.37%	2	0.47%	71	16.78%	423
Davis	54,324	62.71%	30,972	35.75%	1,333	1.54%	23,352	26.96%	86,629
Duchesne	2,597	57.29%	1,857	40.97%	79	1.74%	740	16.32%	4,533
Emery	2,493	56.06%	1,867	41.98%	87	1.96%	626	14.08%	4,447
Garfield	1,224	64.05%	629	32.91%	58	3.04%	595	31.14%	1,911
Grand	1,630	46.53%	1,771	50.56%	102	2.91%	-141	-4.03%	3,503
Iron	8,472	68.44%	3,450	27.87%	457	3.69%	5,022	40.57%	12,379
Juab	1,524	55.87%	1,134	41.57%	70	2.57%	390	14.30%	2,728
Kane	1,881	68.67%	760	27.75%	98	3.58%	1,121	40.93%	2,739
Millard	2,862	60.53%	1,733	36.65%	133	2.81%	1,129	23.88%	4,728
Morgan	1,862	58.87%	1,243	39.30%	58	1.83%	619	19.57%	3,163
Piute	536	70.81%	211	27.87%	10	1.32%	325	42.93%	757
Rich	553	61.58%	341	37.97%	4	0.45%	212	23.61%	898
Salt Lake	141,698	46.46%	157,564	51.67%	5,701	1.87%	-15,866	-5.20%	304,963
San Juan	2,213	46.79%	2,424	51.25%	93	1.97%	-211	-4.46%	4,730
Sanpete	4,498	61.16%	2,596	35.30%	261	3.55%	1,902	25.86%	7,355
Sevier	4,858	69.66%	1,971	28.26%	145	2.08%	2,887	41.40%	6,974
Summit	4,914	41.28%	6,819	57.28%	171	1.44%	-1,905	-16.00%	11,904
Tooele	6,318	51.32%	5,804	47.14%	190	1.54%	514	4.17%	12,312
Uintah	5,026	61.11%	3,018	36.70%	180	2.19%	2,008	24.42%	8,224
Utah	79,626	67.21%	36,202	30.56%	2,639	2.23%	43,424	36.65%	118,467
Wasatch	2,895	51.45%	2,662	47.31%	70	1.24%	233	4.14%	5,627
Washington	21,693	68.14%	9,059	28.45%	1,085	3.41%	12,634	39.68%	31,837
Wayne	733	61.96%	450	38.04%	0	0.00%	283	23.92%	1,183
Weber	32,340	52.23%	28,468	45.98%	1,109	1.79%	3,872	6.25%	61,917
Total	427,837	55.77%	321,979	42.27%	14,990	1.97%	102,858	13.50%	761,806

==== Counties that flipped from Republican to Democratic ====
- Carbon (largest municipality: Price)
- Grand (largest municipality: Moab)
- Salt Lake (largest city: Salt Lake City)
- San Juan (largest municipality: Blanding)
- Summit (largest city: Park City)

== See also ==
- 2000 United States gubernatorial elections
