= Raymond Ward =

American politician

Member of the Utah House of Representatives from the 19th district
- Incumbent
- Assumed office January 1, 2015
- Preceded by: Jim Nielson

Personal details
- Party: Republican
- Spouse: Beverly
- Children: 3
- Education: Brigham Young University (BS); University of Washington (PhD, MD)

Raymond P. Ward is an American politician and physician serving as a member of the Utah House of Representatives from the 19th district. Elected in November 2014, he assumed office on January 1, 2015.

== Education ==
Ward earned a Bachelor of Science degree from Brigham Young University, followed by a PhD in pharmacology and Doctor of Medicine from the University of Washington School of Medicine.

== Career ==
Ward works as a family physician at Cope Family Medicine. He was first elected to the Utah House of Representatives in 2014 and began serving on January 1, 2015.

Representative Ward currently serves on the Social Services Appropriations Subcommittee, the House Health and Human Services Committee, House Transportation Committee, the Legislative Process Committee, and the Education and Mental Health Coordinating Council.

=== Sponsored legislation ===
2022 legislation
Bill	Status
HB0007 Social Services Base Budget	signed by the Governor 2/2/22
HB0047 Extension for Controlled Substance Prescription Requirements	signed by the Governor 3/15/22
HB0095S03 Landscaping Requirements	Sent to House filing for bill not passed
HB0186 Vehicle Registration Amendments	signed by the Governor 3/21/22
HB0216 Office of State Debt Collection Amendments	signed by the Governor 3/24/22
HB0288 New Growth Amendments	sent to House filing for bills not passed 3/4/22
HB0301 Medication Dispenser Amendments	signed by the Governor 3/24/22
HB0432 State Vehicle Use and Purchasing Amendments	sent to House filing for bills not passed 3/4/22
HB0455 Overdose and Suicide Fatality Review Modifications	sent to House filing for bills not passed 3/4/22
HB0461 Spinal Cord and Traumatic Brain Injury Fund Amendments	sent to House filing for bills not passed 3/4/22
HB0486 License Complaint Amendments	sent to House filing for bills not passed 3/4/22
HJR003 Joint Resolution Supporting Federal Carbon Fee and Dividend Program	sent to House filing for bills not passed 3/4/22

== Elections ==
- 2014: Ward defeated Chet Loftis in the Republican convention and faced the Democratic Party nominee Daniel Donahue and Independent American Party nominee Eli Cawley in the general election. Ward won with 7,755 votes (74.5%).

== Personal life ==
Representative Ward lives in Bountiful, Utah with his wife Beverly and three children.

== Electoral Record ==
2024 Utah House of Representatives election, District 19
Party	Candidate	Votes	%
Republican	Raymond Ward	13,620	66.7
Democratic	Nick Wadsworth	5,232	25.6
Constitution	Cameron Dransfield	1,560	7.6
Total votes		20,412	100

2022 Utah House of Representatives election, District 19
Party	Candidate	Votes	%
Republican	Raymond Ward	12,822	100
Total votes		12,822	100

2020 Utah House of Representatives election, District 19
Party	Candidate	Votes	%
Republican	Raymond Ward	15,870	80.4
Constitution	Cameron Dransfield	3,876	19.6
Total votes		19,746	100

2018 Utah House of Representatives election, District 19
Party	Candidate	Votes	%
Republican	Raymond Ward	10,998	65.4
Democratic	Courtney Jones	4,712	28
Libertarian	Joseph Speciale	1,101	6.5
Total votes		16,811	100

2016 Utah House of Representatives election, District 19
Party	Candidate	Votes	%
Republican	Raymond Ward	13,239	71.98
Democratic	Kurt Weiland	5,154	28.02
Total votes		18,393	100

2014 Utah House of Representatives election, District 19
Party	Candidate	Votes	%
Republican	Raymond Ward	7,755	74.5
Democratic	Daniel N. Donahoe	2,133	20.5
Independent	Eli Cawley	526	5.1
Total votes		10,414	100
