= Keven Stratton =

American politician

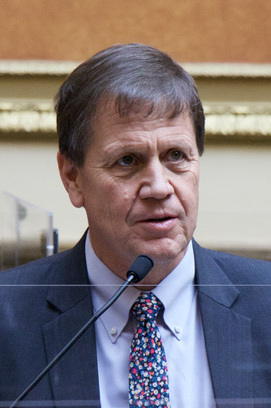

Member of the Utah Senate from the 21st district
- Incumbent
- Assumed office January 1, 2025
- Preceded by: Curt Bramble

Member of the Utah House of Representatives
- In office April 28, 2012 – December 31, 2024
- Preceded by: Stephen Sandstrom
- Succeeded by: David Shallenberger
- Constituency: 58th district (2012–2013); 48th district (2013–2023); 58th district (2023–2024)

Personal details
- Party: Republican
- Education: Brigham Young University; J. Reuben Clark Law School
- Profession: Attorney
- Website: kevenstratton.com

Keven J. Stratton is an American politician and a Republican member of the Utah Senate representing District 24. He previously represented District 58 in the Utah House of Representatives. Stratton was appointed on April 28, 2012, to fill the vacancy caused by the resignation of Stephen Sandstrom. Between 2013 and 2023 he represented district 48. He lives in Orem.

== Early life and education ==
Stratton earned his BS in finance from Brigham Young University and his JD from its J. Reuben Clark Law School. He has eight children, has served as scoutmaster, and has owned and operated small businesses in Utah County. He is a real estate, business, and estate-planning attorney. He is also a land developer and was owner and operator of Cascade Golf Course before its sale and redevelopment in 2013.

== Political career ==
Stratton was appointed on January 1, 2013. During the 2016 Legislative Session, he served on the Executive Offices and Criminal Justice Appropriations Subcommittee, the House Judiciary Committee, and the House Public Utilities, Energy, and Technology Committee.

He has also taken a stand in favor of morality laws such as outlawing sex outside of marriage. He was one of 32 Utah Republicans who voted to keep extra-marital sex illegal in Utah.

Stratton was elected to the Utah Senate in 2024.

== 2016 sponsored legislation ==
Bill number	Bill title	Status
HB0128	Alimony Amendments	House/ filed - 3/10/2016
HB0129	Towing Surcharge Amendments	Governor signed - 3/21/16
HB0219	Resource Management Planning	Governor signed - 3/25/16
HB0335	Public Education Curriculum Amendments	House/ filed - 3/10/2016
HB0343	School Administration Amendments	Governor signed - 3/23/16
HB0374S03	Accessible Parking Amendments	House/ filed - 3/10/2016
HB0430	Hole in the Rock State Park Designation	House/ filed - 3/10/2016
HB0454	Educator Rights Amendments	House/ filed - 3/10/2016
HCR016S01	Concurrent Resolution on Utah Public Lands	House/ filed - 3/10/2016
HCR017S01	Concurrent Resolution Opposing Unilateral Use of the Antiquities Act	House/ filed - 3/10/2016

Stratton also floor-sponsored SB0234 Protecting Unborn Children Amendments and SB0237S01 Immigration and Alien Related Amendments.

== Elections ==
- 2014 Stratton won against Timothy Spencer in the June 24, 2014 primary election and was unopposed for the general election on November 4, 2014, due to Janita Anderson (D) withdrawing before the primary.
- 2012 Redistricted to District 48, and with incumbent Republican Representative LaVar Christensen redistricted to District 32, Stratton was chosen from among five candidates for the June 26, 2012, Republican primary which he won with 3,020 votes (54.7%); and was unopposed for the November 6, 2012, general election, winning with 13,237 votes.
