= Christine Johnson (Utah politician) =

American politician (born 1968)

Christine A. Johnson
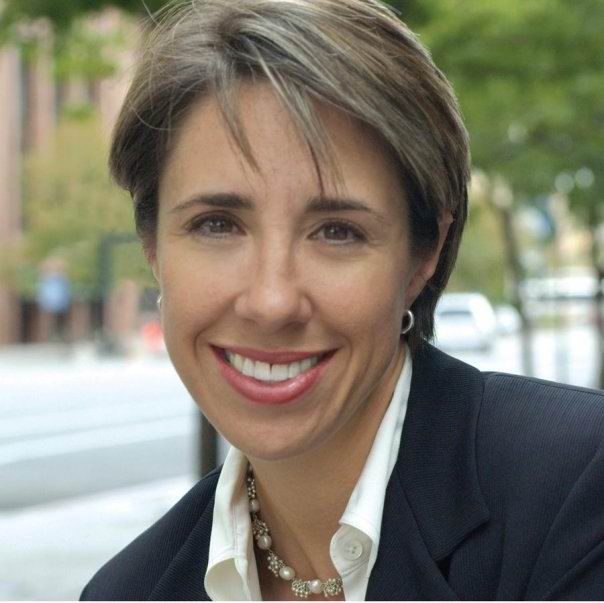

Member of the Utah House of Representatives from the 25th district
- In office January 1, 2007 – July 20, 2010
- Preceded by: Ross I. Romero
- Succeeded by: Joel Briscoe

Personal details
- Born: December 25, 1968 (age 57) Charleston, South Carolina
- Party: Democratic Party

Christine A. Johnson (born December 25, 1968) is an American politician who served as a Democratic member of the Utah House of Representatives from 2007 to 2010.

A native of Charleston, South Carolina, Johnson moved to the Utah Valley when she was a teenager and attended Timpview High School in Provo. She later attended Dixie State College in St. George, Utah, as well as Baltimore Community College and the University of the District of Columbia. Later, she attended Cornell's Executive Leadership Program. She spent eleven years studying classical violin and is a former member of the Utah Youth Symphony.

When state representative Ross I. Romero announced that he would seek a state senate seat in 2006, Johnson ran to replace him in the House. The only female among five candidates running for the seat at the Democratic convention, Johnson won the most support from delegates, finishing just one vote short of winning the nomination outright. On 27 June 2006, a primary election took place between the top two finishers, with Johnson winning by 57% to 43%. She won the general election with 75.4% of the vote.

She is a former chair of the Salt Lake City's East Central Community Council and also served as a member of the Human Rights Commission of Salt Lake City. Johnson is a lesbian and served as one of three openly LGBT members of the Utah legislature, alongside Senator Scott McCoy and Rep. Jackie Biskupski. She is a former board member of Equality Utah and her campaigns have won the support of the Gay & Lesbian Victory Fund. and Emily's List. Representative Johnson served as an advocate for the environment, LGBT equality, women's reproductive rights and election transparency. She served on the House Judiciary, Economic Development, Revenue and Taxation and Speaker appointed Tax Review Commission. During the 2010 legislative session, she negotiated a highly controversial legislative moratorium on anti-gay bills with then-Senate President Michael Whaddoups.

In January 2010 Johnson revealed she was pregnant as a surrogate mother for two gay friends who were married in California before the passage of Proposition 8. She has a daughter from a previous marriage who attended Seattle University and lives in Seattle. Johnson gave birth in June 2010 to a baby boy.

On March 4, 2010 Johnson announced she would not seek re-election to the Utah House.

In July 2010 Johnson became the executive director of the GLBT civil rights group South Carolina Equality.

In January 2012 Johnson offered a TEDx talk entitled "Say Yes" in Columbia, South Carolina. TEDx Talk

In October 2012 Johnson stepped down as executive director of South Carolina Equality. During her 29 months as executive director, SC Equality acquired the second pro-equality license plate in the Nation, created a PAC and defeated an anti-transgender health care bill. Johnson also facilitated a working relationship between the SC NAACP and SC Equality to bring about the introduction of statewide hate crime legislation.

In May 2013, Johnson became the Vice President of External Affairs for Planned Parenthood of Greater Washington and North Idaho and later resigned on March 28, 2014, to travel internationally and consult with NGOs abroad.

In May 2014, she traveled to Thailand, providing non-profit consulting to a Dhammakaya Buddhist Monk and in November 2014, Johnson became State Program Manager for the South Carolina Chapter of Experience Works, formerly Green Thumb, which until 2017 was the largest SCSEP grantee of DOL funding under the Older Americans Act.

Johnson altered her career path in 2017, becoming a private chef.
