= Curt Bramble =

American politician

Curtis S. Bramble
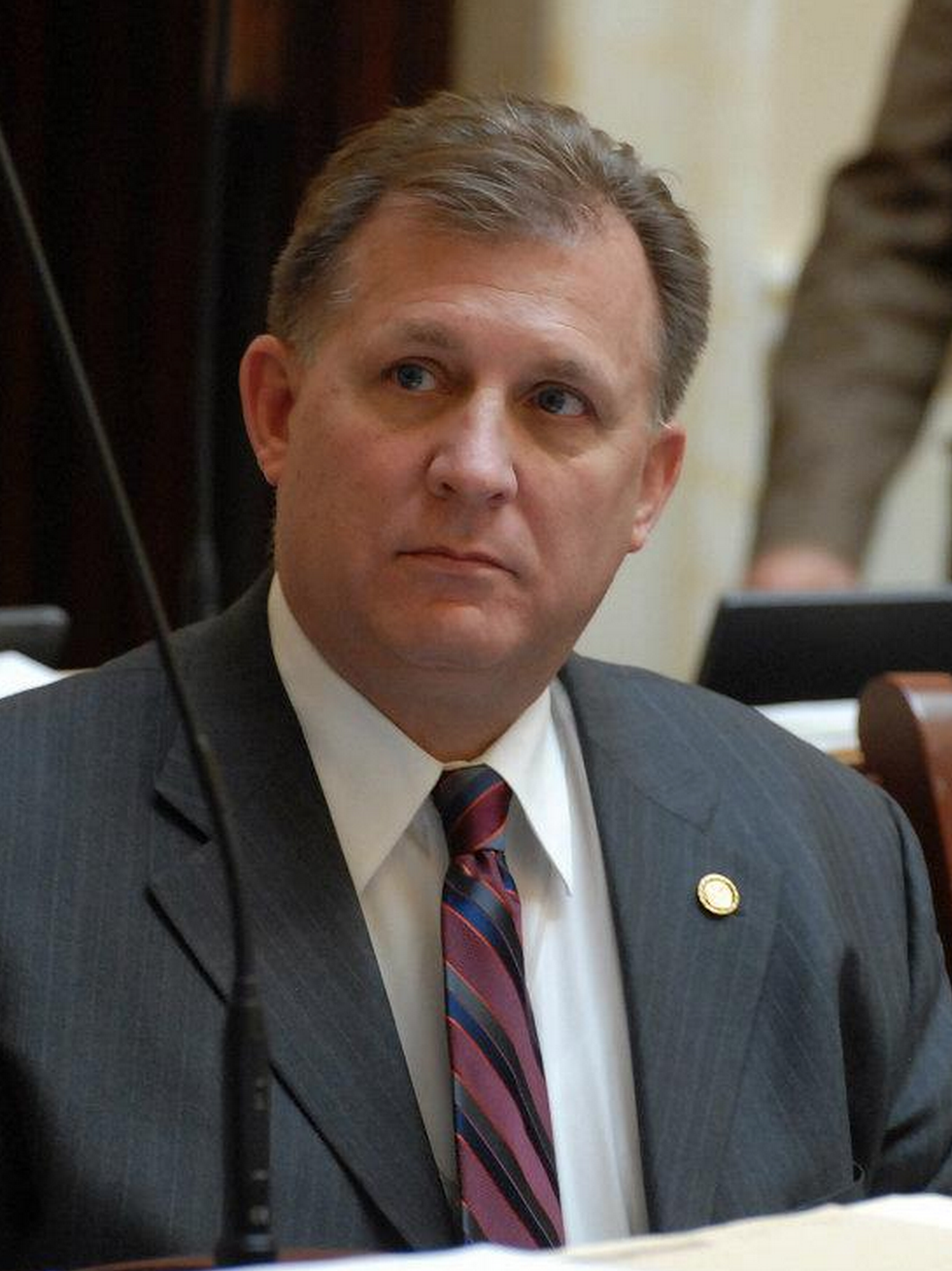
- Bramble in July 2014

Member of the Utah Senate
- In office January 1, 2001 – December 31, 2024
- Preceded by: Howard C. Nielson
- Succeeded by: Keven Stratton
- Constituency: 16th district (2001–2023); 24th district (2023–2024)

President of the National Conference of State Legislatures
- In office 2015–2016
- Preceded by: Debbie Smith
- Succeeded by: Mike Gronstal

Personal details
- Born: Chicago, Illinois
- Party: Republican
- Spouse: Susan
- Children: 6
- Education: Brigham Young University (BS, MS)
- Occupation: Certified Public Accountant
- Website: Legislative Website

Curtis Scott Bramble is an American politician and Certified Public Accountant who served as a member of the Utah State Senate, representing the state's 24th senate district. Prior to redistricting he represented the 16th senate district in Provo. On March 18, 2024, he announced that he would retire from the legislature at the end of 2024.

== Early life and career ==
Bramble was born and raised in Chicago, Illinois, where he graduated from Crown High School. He grew up as a Methodist and joined the Church of Jesus Christ of Latter-day Saints while attending Notre Dame University. After Notre Dame, Bramble attended Brigham Young University, where he graduated with a B.S in and M.S. in accounting.

== Career ==
Bramble worked as a Certified Public Accountant in Utah. Bramble was appointed as the Advisory Committee Chairman for Medical Cannabis Payment Solutions, a Las Vegas Company specializing in providing end-to-end management, across multiple management systems, for medicinal marijuana operations.

=== Utah Senate ===
Bramble was elected to the Utah Senate in 2000 and took office in January 2001. He initially served on the Business, Labor and Economic Development, and Revenue and Taxation Standing Committees; and on the Health and Human Services Joint Appropriation Committee. In 2004, Bramble became the Majority Leader of the Utah Senate for the 57th Utah Legislature and the Co-Chair of the Retirement and Independent Entities Joint Appropriation Committee. He also served on the Executive Offices and Criminal Justice, and Higher Education Joint Appropriations committees and Chaired the Retirement and Independent Entities Standing Committee. He also served on the Revenue and Taxation Committee for the 57th Utah State Legislature. Bramble was reelected to his third term to the Utah Senate in November 2008, defeating Democrat Radene Hatfield.

Senator Bramble is currently up for reelection and has two challengers in the primary.

==== Committee assignments ====
- Business, Economic Development, and Labor Appropriations Subcommittee
- Executive Offices and Criminal Justice Appropriations Subcommittee
- Retirement and Independent Entities Appropriations Subcommittee
- Senate Business and Labor Committee (Chair)
- Senate Retirement and Independent Entities Committee
- Senate Revenue and Taxation Committee

In 2008, Bramble received the National Legislator of the Year Award from the American Legislative Exchange Council (ALEC) and he has served on the board of directors of ALEC. Bramble served as president of the National Conference of State Legislatures from 2015 to 2016.

=== Notable legislation ===
In 2014, Bramble sponsored S.B. 54 Second Substitute Elections Amendments. The enacted bill allows for an optional open primary. During the 2016 legislative session Senator Bramble passed a bill that would require doctors to give anesthesia to fetuses during an abortion after 20 weeks of pregnancy.

=== Float building controversy ===
The Deseret Morning News and Salt Lake Tribune called for an ethics investigation into an incident involving Bramble, Representative Becky Lockhart and Mountainland Technical College (known at time as the Mountainland Applied Technology College). Allegedly Bramble and Lockhart asked the college to build the Republican party a float to use in parades. The college used its money to pay for the float which, the papers alleged, violated Utah law, e.g., that "a public entity may not make expenditures from public funds for political purposes." When questions arose, college President Clay Christensen told State Auditor Auston Johnson he was under "tremendous pressure" by the Utah County GOP and lawmakers to build the float, but later that same day, after a conversation with Bramble, he changed his statement. Bramble first denied speaking with Christiansen but later acknowledged he "may have called," but couldn't "recall what was said." No investigation ensued.

== Personal life ==
Bramble lives in Provo with his wife Susan. He has six children and 12 grandchildren.

== Electoral results ==
Senator Bramble is up for election in 2016 and currently has two challengers in the primary.

Utah State Senate election, 2008
Party	Candidate	Votes	%	±%
Republican	Curt Bramble	11,717	62	
Democratic	RaDene Hatfield	7,314	38	

Utah State Senate election, 2004
Party	Candidate	Votes	%	±%
Republican	Curt Bramble	15,778	77	
Democratic	Fred D. Posorio	4,227	21	
Libertarian	Brady Fackrell	535	2	

== See also ==
- 54th Utah State Legislature
