= Bill Orton =

American politician

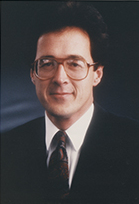

Member of the U.S. House of Representatives from Utah's 3rd district
- In office January 3, 1991 – January 3, 1997
- Preceded by: Howard Nielson
- Succeeded by: Chris Cannon

Personal details
- Born: William Orton; September 22, 1948 North Ogden, Utah, U.S.
- Died: April 18, 2009 (aged 60) Juab County, Utah, U.S.
- Party: Democratic
- Education: Brigham Young University, Utah (BA, JD)

William Harvey Orton (September 22, 1948 – April 18, 2009) was an American Democratic politician who served as a member of the United States House of Representatives from Utah from 1991 to 1997.

== Biography ==
=== Early life and education ===
Born in North Ogden, Utah to Donald William Orton and Caroll Olsen, Orton was a member of the Church of Jesus Christ of Latter-day Saints. His paternal great-great-grandfather John Orton was born in Blaby near Leicester in England, and emigrated to the Salt Lake area in 1851 following his conversion to Mormonism. He attended Brigham Young University, from which he earned his undergraduate degree and his Juris Doctor. Orton was hired in 1966, at age 16, by the Internal Revenue Service, and continued his employment there throughout high school, college and law school. While in law school, Orton also served as president of his law school fraternity and was a founder and charter member of the American Inns of Court, a law school organization with chapters throughout the country. In 1979, he set up a private law practice.

=== Politics ===
In 1990, Orton ran for the open 3rd District seat, his first bid for public office. He defeated Republican Karl Snow by 22 points, a major upset considering that the 3rd, then as now, was reckoned as strongly Republican. He was re-elected in 1992 and 1994. While in the House, Orton served at various times on the Banking, Budget, Small Business, and Foreign Affairs Committees. Orton was also a founder and member of the Blue Dog Coalition, a caucus of United States Congressional Representatives from the Democratic Party who identify themselves as moderates and conservatives.

Orton was one of the few bright spots for the Democrats when the Republicans took control of the House in the 1994 elections. In a year when many districts far less Republican than Orton's reverted to form (including the Salt Lake City-based 2nd District, traditionally the most Democratic district in the state), Orton won by just over 19 points. The 1994 election left Orton as the only Democrat representing Utah at the federal level.

In the spring of 1996, as he was preparing for his re-election that year, Orton was injured in an accident. As he was walking down a tunnel to make a House vote, he was struck from behind by a federal employee who was running behind him.

In 1996, Orton was narrowly defeated by Republican businessman Chris Cannon during his bid for a fourth term. He left Congress as his third term expired in January 1997, and no Democrat would be elected to Congress from Utah again until Jim Matheson's victory in 2000. The Democrats have not seriously contested the 3rd District since then; indeed, no Democrat has crossed the 40 percent mark since Orton's defeat, proving just how Republican this district was. Utah and national political pundits blame Orton's loss on the creation of the Grand Staircase–Escalante National Monument without local input.

During his tenure in Congress, Orton frequently voted against his party. A 1994 Congressional Quarterly study showed him voting against President Bill Clinton more frequently than 27 House Republicans. He voted with his party only 58 percent of the time, which was the ninth lowest score of House Democrats.

=== After politics ===
Following his departure from Congress, Orton resumed the practice of law and was a member of the legal counsel of the plaintiff in Idaho Potato Growers v. Rubin, a case Clinton v. City of New York in which the Line Item Veto Act of 1996 was ruled unconstitutional. While serving in congress, Orton argued on the floor of the US House of Representatives that, as a "budget hawk", he was in favor of the President having the line item veto. However, the version that the Republican-controlled Congress brought up for a vote was written in an unconstitutional manner. The Supreme Court confirmed Orton's assertions. Congressional historians believe Orton to be the only person in the history of the United States to argue and vote against a piece of legislation in Congress, have it signed into law, then successfully argue to have it overturned by the US Supreme Court.

Following his work on Clinton v. City of New York, Orton joined Advantage Associates, a consulting firm made up of former members of congress. In 2000, Orton unsuccessfully challenged incumbent Michael Leavitt for the governorship.

Orton was a superdelegate during the 2008 Democratic Party primary, casting his vote for Barack Obama.

=== Personal life and death ===
Orton was a bachelor for a long part of his life. In 1990, during his first congressional run, his opponent Karl Snow's financial chairman was quoted as having said "Bill Orton is not fit for life, much less Congress" four days before the election, in reference to Orton being a never married 42-year old, whilst Utah is a majority Mormon state, a denomination that encourages early marriage and large families. Two days before the election, Utah Republican Party ran an additional ad in Utah County Journal, with a picture of Orton standing alone next to a picture of Snow with his large family, with the caption "Some candidates want you to believe that their personal values don't matter. Most issues facing the United States Congress seriously affect our families. Families do matter! Vote Republican." Orton won the election, and the ad was perceived by some to have backfired. On July 2, 1994, while in office, 45-year old Orton married 29-year old Jacquelyn Massey, an associate director of the National Association of Federal Credit Unions and a former House Banking Committee staffer. During his wedding reception, his pager warned him about an upcoming vote on an Intelligence Appropriations bill amendment, leading to him running four blocks to the House floor for the vote. Orton and his wife had two sons, Will (born 1995) and Wesley (born 1997).

Orton died in an ATV accident on April 18, 2009, at Little Sahara Recreation Area in Juab County, Utah. Utah Governor Jon Huntsman Jr. ordered flags flown at half-staff on April 24, the day of Orton's funeral. The U.S. House of Representatives honored Orton with a moment of silence three days after his death with House members and congressional leaders eulogizing him on the House floor.

In 2018, Orton's widow Jacquelyn ran for Utah State House, coming fourth in the Democratic primary.

U.S. House of Representatives
Preceded by Howard Nielson	Member of the U.S. House of Representatives from Utah's 3rd congressional district 1991–1997	Succeeded by Chris Cannon
Party political offices
Preceded by James Bradley	Democratic nominee for Governor of Utah; 2000	Succeeded by Scott Matheson
