= Karl N. Snow =

American politician (1930–2024)

Member of the Utah Senate from the 16th district
- In office 1973–1984

Personal details
- Born: July 1, 1930 St. George, Utah, U.S.
- Died: August 28, 2024 (aged 94) Provo, Utah, U.S.
- Party: Republican
- Spouse: Donna Jean Dain Snow
- Profession: Academic, educational administrator

Karl Nelson Snow Jr. (July 1, 1930 – August 28, 2024), was an American politician who was a Republican member of the Utah State Senate and was the senate majority leader from 1981-1982.

== Career and education ==
Snow, a former professor at Brigham Young University, attended BYU (B.S. in Political Science), the University of Minnesota (MS in Public Administration) and the University of Southern California, (Ph.D.).

He and his wife Donna have six children and have served in several humanitarian efforts, including an LDS Charities mission to Swaziland and Lesotho that focused on providing Measles immunizations.

In 1990, Howard C. Nielson, the four-term Republican Congressman of Utah's 3rd congressional district retired. Snow ran in the Republican primary, beating out John Harmer for the nomination. With the district based in Eastern Utah and anchored in Provo, home to a substantial Mormon population (encouraging early marriage and large families) with strong Republican sympathies, Snow was considered a shoo-in for the race, as Nielson had always been elected to represent the district with at least two-thirds of the vote. However, four days before the election, Snow's financial chairman ran an attack ad on Democratic nominee Bill Orton, a 42-year old never married lawyer, as "Bill Orton is not fit for life, much less Congress". Two days before the election, the Utah Republican Party, attempting to further capitalize on the electorate's socially conservative views, ran an ad in the newspaper Utah County Journal, depicting a photo of Snow with his wife and six children, captioned as "Karl Snow and his family", next to a photo of Orton alone, captioned as "Bill Orton and his family", with a larger caption "Some candidates want you to believe that their personal values don't matter. Most issues facing the United States Congress seriously affect our families. Families do matter! Vote Republican." However, the ad backfired, alienating voters, and instead Orton defeated Snow by 22 points. Following the loss of the election, Snow said he would not run for office again.

== Later life and death ==
They resided in Provo, Utah in their retirement. He died in Provo, Utah on August 28, 2024, at the age of 94.
