= Howard C. Nielson =

American politician (1924–2020)

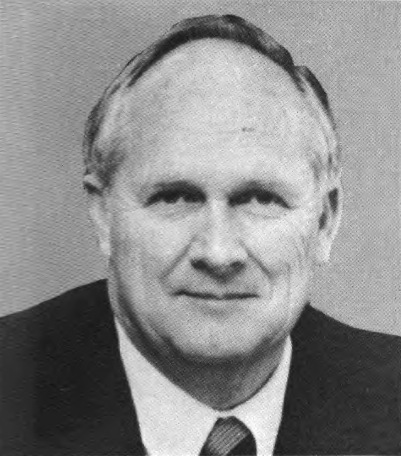

Member of the Utah Senate from the 16th district
- In office January 20, 1997 – December 31, 2000
- Preceded by: Charles H. Stewart
- Succeeded by: Curt Bramble

Member of the U.S. House of Representatives from Utah's 3rd district
- In office January 3, 1983 – January 3, 1991
- Preceded by: Constituency established
- Succeeded by: Bill Orton

Speaker of the Utah House of Representatives
- In office January 8, 1973 – January 12, 1975
- Preceded by: Richard C. Howe
- Succeeded by: Ronald L. Rencher

Member of the Utah House of Representatives
- In office January 9, 1967 – January 12, 1975

Personal details
- Born: Howard Curtis Nielson; September 12, 1924 Richfield, Utah, U.S.
- Died: May 20, 2020 (aged 95) South Carolina, U.S.
- Party: Republican
- Spouse(s): Julia Adams (died 2003); Donna Packard (2006–2015; her death)
- Children: 7 (including Howard Jr. and Jim)
- Education: University of Utah (BS); University of Oregon (MS); Stanford University (MBA, PhD)

Military service
- Allegiance: United States
- Branch/service: United States Army Air Forces
- Years of service: 1943–1946
- Rank: Sergeant
- Battles/wars: World War II

Howard Curtis Nielson (September 12, 1924 – May 20, 2020) was an American politician in the Republican Party. From 1983 to 1991, Nielson represented Utah's 3rd congressional district in the United States House of Representatives.

== Early life ==
Nielson was born in Richfield, Utah; his paternal grandparents were immigrants from Denmark. After graduating from Richfield High School in 1942, he served as a sergeant in the United States Army Air Forces during World War II from 1943 to 1946. He continued his education, earning his B.S. from the University of Utah in 1947, M.S. from the University of Oregon in 1949, and M.B.A. and Ph.D from Stanford University in 1956 and 1958, respectively.

He later founded the Department of Statistics at Brigham Young University, Provo.

== Political career ==
Nielson first served in political office as a member of the Utah House of Representatives from 1967 to 1974, serving as Speaker of the House in his last term. He was an associate commissioner on the Utah Commission for Higher Education for two years. He was a delegate to the Utah State Republican Conventions from 1960 to 1982.

He was elected as a Republican to the United States House of Representatives from Utah and served four terms, from January 3, 1983, to January 3, 1991. While in Congress, Nielson sponsored two resolutions calling on Israel to reopen Palestinian schools and colleges. In 1985 he was one of just two "nay" voters on a resolution urging Taiwan to extradite gangster Chen Chi-li, who had murdered dissident journalist Henry Liu in San Francisco the previous year. He also cosponsored a bill to limit tobacco advertising. He also was a leading proponent of releasing the names of people who tested positive for AIDS to Public Health Officials. Nielson was also one of the main negotiators of the 1990 Clean Air Act. Nielson was an early promoter of rating of song lyrics.

In 1996, Nielson was elected to the Utah State Senate. He retired from Congress so he could serve as a missionary for The Church of Jesus Christ of Latter-day Saints with his wife. They served as missionaries in both Australia and Hungary.

== Personal life ==
Nielson and his wife Julia had seven children, three sons and four daughters.

Nielson's first wife died in 2003. He later married Donna Esther Brown, herself a widow and the sister of one of his former House colleagues, Ron Packard of California. Donna died in 2015 of bone marrow cancer. Howard Nielson died on May 20, 2020, at the age of 95.

One of Nielson's children, Howard Jr., is a Judge on the United States District Court for the District of Utah beginning in 2019.

== See also ==
- 54th Utah State Legislature

U.S. House of Representatives
New district	Member of the U.S. House of Representatives from Utah's 3rd congressional district 1983–1991	Succeeded by Bill Orton
Utah State Senate
Preceded by Charles H. Stewart	Member of the Utah State Senate from the 16th district 1997–2001	Succeeded by Curt Bramble
