= Karen Hale =

American politician

Member of the Utah Senate from the 7th district
- In office 1998–2006
- Succeeded by: Ross I. Romero

Personal details
- Born: June 24, 1958 (age 68)
- Party: Democratic
- Education: University of Utah (BS)

Karen Hale (born June 24, 1958) is an American politician from Salt Lake City, Utah. She represented Utah's 7th senate district in the Utah State Senate from 1998 to 2006, and was the Democratic nominee for lieutenant governor in 2000 and 2004.

== Education, career, civic and personal ==
Hale is a graduate of the University of Utah with a B.S. in Mass Communication. She was publisher and editor of "Parent Express," a magazine for Utah families. She was Statewide Education Chair for Earth Day Utah in 1990. In 1997, she was Public Relations Chair for the Sugarhouse Sesquicentennial Celebration. She has served on community boards, including the Envision Utah Steering Committee, the Utah Film Center and KUED. She serves as a Trustee of Intermountain Healthcare, Inc., and she has served on Intermountain's Primary Children's Medical Center Board of Trustees since 2008 - she was named the chair in 2010. She and her husband Jon are the parents of five children and have nine grandchildren.

== Political career ==
Hale won her 1998 run for Utah State Senate district 7 with 50.28% of the vote. She was the Democratic candidate for Lieutenant Governor in 2000, and again in 2004. She won her 2002 re-election bid to the state senate with 66.61% of the vote. During her two terms in the Utah State Senate, she was a member of the Transportation and Public Safety Committee, the Senate Education Standing Committee, and the Public Education Appropriations Subcommittee, as well as Minority Caucus Manager. In 2005 she served as Assistant Minority Whip. Hale is a co-founder of the Coalition for Quality Public Education (COPE), a nonpartisan group working for education funding in Utah. In 2007, the Utah Democratic Party gave Hale the Eleanor Roosevelt Award.

Hale served as a Director of Communications in the office of Salt Lake City Mayor Ralph Becker. While there, she was Vice Chair of the Utah Coalition for Civic, Character & Service Learning. When Becker's term ended in 2016, Hale went to work for Salt Lake County Mayor Ben McAdams, as Deputy Mayor of Community and External Affairs.
