= Take Back Vermont =

Take Back Vermont was an issue-oriented political campaign in the U.S. state of Vermont in the year 2000. Its formation was triggered by the state legislature's passage of a law establishing civil unions for same-sex couples in 2000. Its aim was wider than repealing the civil unions law. It was also a counter-reaction to the state's changing demographics, particularly the arrival of large numbers of affluent, liberal, Democratic residents from out-of-state, sometimes called flatlanders. Ruth Dwyer, the Republican nominee for governor that year who, despite being from out of state herself, was closely identified with the movement, spoke of "a clash of outlooks" with the other side consisting of "new people who make the rules for others and don't listen".

Signs bearing the words "Take Back Vermont" were printed by the thousands and were sold for $5 apiece. They became a regular fixture on roadside barns, garages and front porches, most prominently in Orange and Washington counties. In 2010, it was reported that signs could still be seen along Route 30 and Route 25.

The intent of the movement was to obtain public support (money and votes) to elect officeholders who would repeal these liberal statutes. Ultimately, the movement was unsuccessful. In retrospect, the movement was part of the ongoing culture war.

== Background ==
In December 1999, the Vermont Supreme Court ruled in Baker v. Vermont that existing prohibitions on same-sex marriage were a violation of rights granted by the Vermont Constitution. As a result, the Vermont legislature was ordered to either allow same-sex marriages, or implement an alternative legal mechanism according similar rights. The legislature ultimately voted to enact civil unions but only after months of heated and acrimonious debate. The controversy touched every corner of the state as residents expressed their views through public meetings, lobbying campaigns and placards. Like the civil unions debate, the presence of Take Back Vermont signs was deeply polarizing.

== Impact ==
The movement was inherently political and it defined the 2000 election in the state, particularly the gubernatorial race. Howard Dean, the Democratic governor who had signed the civil unions bill, faced a challenge from Ruth Dwyer, a Republican running on a platform closely tied to the Take Back Vermont movement. Dean, actively campaigning to take Vermont forward instead, won re-election but Republicans managed to win a majority in the state's House of Representatives. Indeed, the House voted the following year to outlaw same-sex civil unions, although the Democratic-controlled Senate killed that measure.

In the longer term, the movement was largely unsuccessful. The legislature revisited the issue of rights for gay couples in 2009, when it debated and ultimately passed a same-sex marriage bill. Take Back Vermont signs made an appearance then as well, although to a far lesser extent. The 2009 debate on marriage was notable for being far less divisive than the 2000 debate on civil unions.
