= 1998 Vermont gubernatorial election =

- November 3, 1998
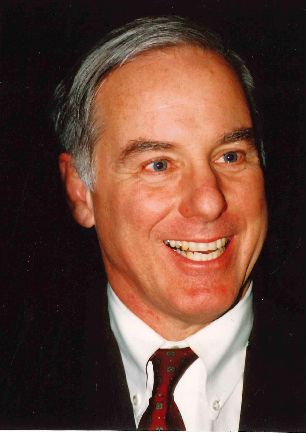

Nominee	Howard Dean	Ruth Dwyer
Party	Democratic	Republican
Popular vote	121,425	89,726
Percentage	55.67%	41.14%
- Dean: 40–50% 50–60% 60–70% 70–80% 80–90% Dwyer: 40–50% 50–60% 60–70% 70–80% 80–90% >90%
Governor before election
Howard Dean
Democratic
Elected Governor
Howard Dean
Democratic

The 1998 Vermont gubernatorial election took place on November 3, 1998. Incumbent Democrat Howard Dean ran successfully for re-election to a fourth full term as Governor of Vermont, defeating Republican candidate Ruth Dwyer.

This is the last time to date that Franklin County voted Democratic in a gubernatorial election.

== Democratic primary ==
=== Results ===
Democratic primary results
Party	Candidate	Votes	%	±%
Democratic	Howard Dean (incumbent)	16,798	93.5	
Democratic	Other	1,150	6.4	
Total votes		17,948	100.0	

== Republican primary ==
=== Results ===
Republican primary results
Party	Candidate	Votes	%	±%
Republican	Ruth Dwyer	30,224	57.5	
Republican	Bernie Rome	21,196	40.3	
Republican	Other	1,111	2.1	
Total votes		52,531	100.0	

== Other ==
The Draft Clavelle for Governor Committee was formed on September 11, 1998, and attempted to gather 1,000 signatures to place Peter Clavelle on the ballot. However, Clavelle announced that he would not run on September 14.

== General election ==
=== Polling ===
Poll source	Date(s) administered	Sample size (Note: Key: A – all adults RV – registered voters LV – likely voters V – unclear)	Margin of error	Howard Dean (D)	Ruth Dwyer (R)	Undecided
Mason Dixon	October 10–12, 1998	626 (LV)	± 4.0%	64%	24%	12%
Mason Dixon	September 1–3, 1998	628 (LV)	± 4.0%	59%	23%	18%

=== Results ===
1998 Vermont gubernatorial election
Party	Candidate	Votes	%	±%
Democratic	Howard Dean (incumbent)	121,425	55.67	
Republican	Ruth Dwyer	89,726	41.14	
Vermont Grassroots	Joel Williams	3,305	1.52	
Libertarian	Amy Berkey	2,141	0.98	
Liberty Union	Richard Gottlieb	1,177	0.54	
Write-in		346	0.16	
Total votes		218,120	100.00	

== See also ==
- 1998 United States Senate election in Vermont
- 1998 United States House of Representatives election in Vermont
