= Ruth Dwyer (politician) =

American politician

Member of the Vermont House of Representatives from the Orange-4 district
- In office January 1995 – January 1999
- Preceded by: Doris Lingelbach
- Succeeded by: Jim Masland

Personal details
- Born: April 25, 1958 (age 68) Painesville, Ohio, U.S.
- Party: Republican
- Education: University of Vermont (attended)

Ruth Dwyer (born April 25, 1958) is an American political figure who was the unsuccessful Republican nominee for Governor of Vermont in 1998 and 2000.

== Life and career ==
Ruth Dwyer was born Ruth E. Cook in Painesville, Ohio on April 25, 1958. She attended schools in Glens Falls, New York and Shelburne, Vermont. Her family became residents of Thetford in 1971, and she graduated from Thetford Academy in 1976, afterwards attending the University of Vermont. With her then-husband Dr. John Dwyer she operated the Thetford Veterinary Clinic, raised cattle and sheep, and was a horse trainer and riding instructor.

Dwyer served on the Thetford School Board from 1992 to 1994. In 1994 she was elected to the Vermont House of Representatives as a Republican. She served two terms, 1995 to 1999.

In 1998 Dwyer was the Republican nominee for Governor. She defeated ski store owner Bernie Rome in the Republican primary. In the general election, she opposed Howard Dean as he sought election to a fourth full term. Dean defeated Dwyer, 55.6% to 41.1%.

Dwyer ran again in 2000. Vermont had enacted the country's first Civil Unions law in 2000, which sparked a conservative counter-movement called Take Back Vermont. Dwyer associated herself with this movement, and defeated William Meub in the Republican primary. In the general election, Dean won a fifth full term with 50.4% to Dwyer's 37.9% and 9.5% for Progressive nominee Anthony Pollina.

After her second race, Dwyer briefly became a television journalist for WVNY in Burlington. In 2001 she was divorced from Dr. Dwyer, and in 2002 she married New Hampshire businessman Tom Kent and became known as Ruth Dwyer Kent. She continues to reside in Thetford, where she raises horses and operates a riding school. She remains active in the community, including holding the local office of pound keeper.

== External resources ==
- You Tube video, No Hands at Ruth D.'s, Ruth Dwyer giving riding lesson, uploaded by Alexandra Wilson, July 7, 2009
- C-Span video, Vermont Gubernatorial debate, September 24, 2000 (Includes links to videos of other Vermont Governor's election debates from 1998 and 2000.)

Party political offices
Preceded by John Gropper	Republican nominee for Governor of Vermont; 1998, 2000	Succeeded by Jim Douglas
