= 2026 United States House of Representatives elections in Utah =

- November 3, 2026

All 4 Utah seats to the United States House of Representatives
| | Majority party | Minority party |
|---|---|---|
| Party | Republican | Democratic |
| Last election | 4 | 0 |
| Seats won | 3 | 1 |
| Seat change | ▼1 | ▲1 |
| Popular vote | 485,064 | 490,729 |
| Percentage | 46.37% | 46.91% |
| Swing | ▼16.40% | ▲14.39% |

Republican hold
Democratic gain
Republican
40–50%
50–60%
60–70%
70–80%
Democratic
40–50%
50–60%
60–70%
70–80%

The 2026 United States House of Representatives elections in Utah were held on November 3, 2026, to elect the four U.S. representatives from the State of Utah, one from all four of the state's congressional districts. The elections coincided with the other elections to the House of Representatives, elections to the United States Senate, and various state and local elections. The primary elections took place on June 23, 2026.

For the first time since 1990, Democrats won the House popular vote.

== Background ==
Map of Utah's congressional districts as ordered by the Third District Court of Utah on November 10, 2025 and will be used starting at the 2026 House elections. Interactive map version

The Utah Supreme Court ruled in July 2024 that the state legislature had overstepped their constitutional authority when it repealed Proposition 4 in 2020 (and subsequently drew congressional districts that heavily favored Republican candidates). The case was remanded to the district court to determine a final remedy. The decision was decided on August 25, 2025, ordering the new Utah congressional map be redrawn within 30 days.

Utah's state legislature passed a new map on October 11, 2025, which created two competitive seats leaning slightly Republican. District judge Dianna Gibson enjoined the map passed by legislature on November 10, and selected a map drawn by civil groups as the final map, which contained a solidly Democratic seat centered around Salt Lake City.

== Statewide polling ==
=== Statewide congressional polls ===
| Poll source | Date(s) administered | Sample size (Note: Key: A – all adults RV – registered voters LV – likely voters V – unclear) | Margin of error | Republican | Democratic | Other | Undecided |
|---|---|---|---|---|---|---|---|
| Morning Consult (Note: Poll sponsored by Deseret News & the Hinckley Institute of Politics) | October 13–20, 2026 | 875 (RV) | ± 3.0% | 50% | 39% | – | 11% |
| Morning Consult | September 10–15, 2026 | 744 (RV) | ± 4.0% | 51% | 36% | – | 13% |
| Noble Predictive Insights | September 8–12, 2026 | 602 (RV) | ± 3.99% | 45% | 25% | 4% | 26% |

== District 1 ==
2026 Utah's 1st congressional district election
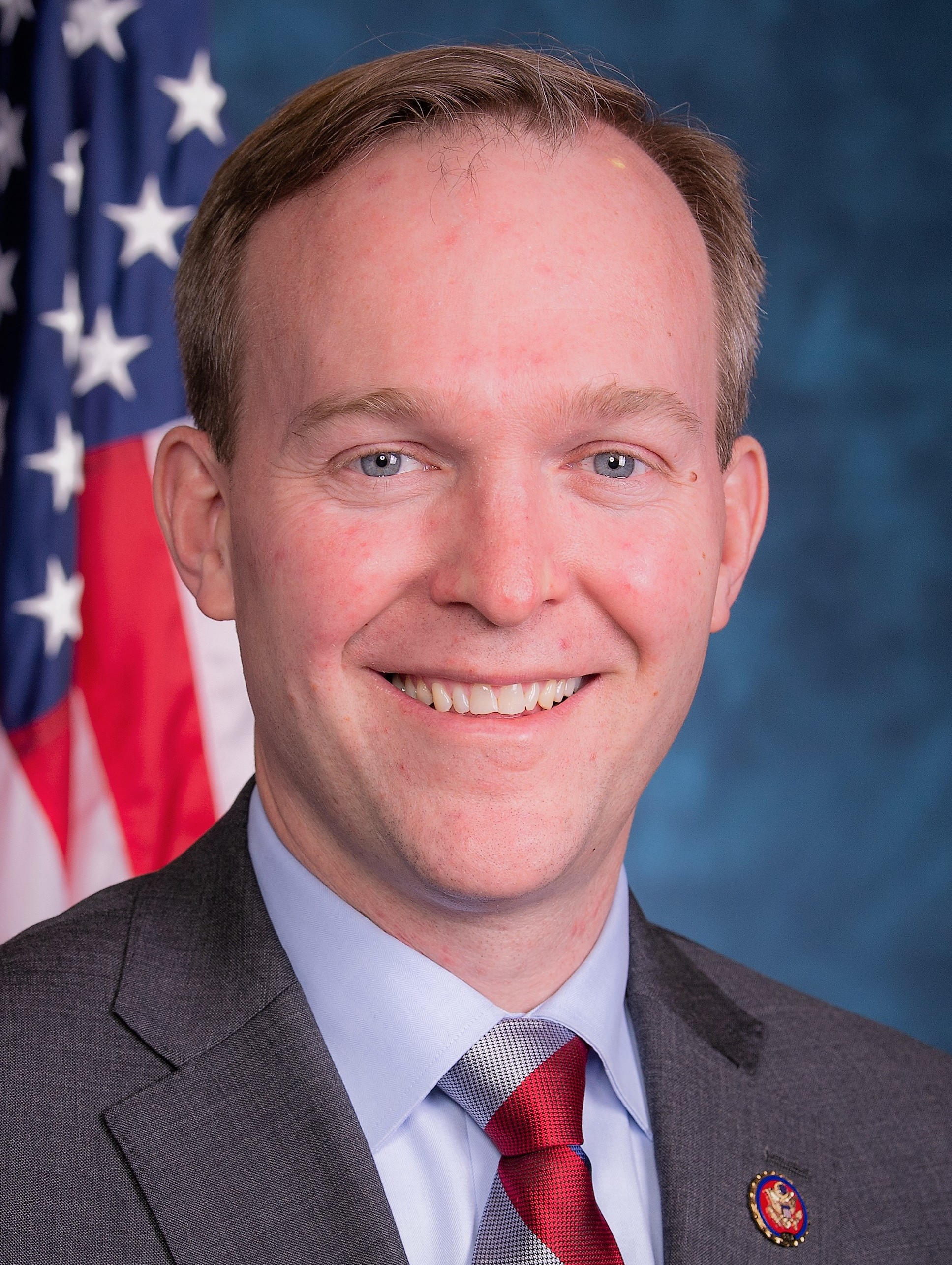

| Nominee | Ben McAdams | Riley Owen |
| Party | Democratic | Republican |
| Popular vote | 165,422 | 61,230 |
| Percentage | 70.31% | 26.02% |
U.S. Representative before election
Blake Moore
Republican
Elected U.S. Representative
Ben McAdams
Democratic

Utah's 1st congressional district boundary from the 2026 elections Interactive map version

The new district is based in and encompasses the majority of Salt Lake County, including the cities of Salt Lake City, West Valley, Millcreek, Cottonwood Heights, and Murray, as well as the Salt Lake City International Airport and the University of Utah. Due to redistricting, this is a district with no incumbent. In the 2024 presidential election, Democrat Kamala Harris won the district by a 24-point margin.

=== Republican primary ===
==== Candidates ====
===== Nominee =====
- Riley Owen, former White House policy analyst

===== Eliminated at convention =====
- Stone Fonua
- Dave Robinson, former Salt Lake County Republican Party communications director

===== Filed paperwork =====
- Jonathan Lopez, Democratic candidate for Utah's 4th congressional district in 2024

===== Withdrawn =====
- Adam Clayton
- Blake Moore, incumbent U.S. representative (running in the 2nd district)

==== Convention ====
State Republican convention results, 2026
| Candidate | Round 1 | |
| Candidate | Votes | % |
|---|---|---|
| Riley Owen | 337 | 71.25% |
| Dave Robinson | 129 | 27.27% |
| Steve Fonua | 7 | 1.48% |
| Inactive Ballots | 0 ballots | |

=== Democratic primary ===
==== Candidates ====
===== Nominee =====
- Ben McAdams, former U.S. representative from the 4th district (2019–2021)

===== Eliminated in primary =====
- Nate Blouin, state senator from the 13th district (2023–present)
- Michael Farrell, tax attorney
- Liban Mohamed, former government relations director for the American Heart Association in Utah

===== Eliminated at convention =====
- Eva Lopez Chavez, Salt Lake City councilmember from the 4th district (2024–2026)
- Luis Villarreal, software engineer

===== Withdrawn =====
- Derek Kitchen, former state senator from the 2nd district (2019–2022) (endorsed Mohamed)
- Kathleen Riebe, state senator from the 15th district (2019–present) and nominee for the 2nd district in 2023 (endorsed McAdams)
- Anthony Tomkins, utilities technician

===== Declined =====
- Erin Mendenhall, mayor of Salt Lake City (2020–present) (endorsed McAdams)
- Angela Romero, minority leader of the Utah House of Representatives (2023–present) from the 25th district (2013–present)(endorsed Mohamed)

==== Endorsements ====
Nate Blouin

U.S. senators

- Bernie Sanders, Vermont (2007–present) (Independent)

U.S. representatives

- Greg Casar, TX-35 (2023–present)
- Maxwell Frost, FL-10 (2023–present)
- Pramila Jayapal, WA-07 (2017–present)
- Ro Khanna, CA-17 (2017–present)
- Jill Tokuda, HI-02 (2023–present)

Local officials

- Natalie Pinkney, Salt Lake County councilmember (2024–present)

Organizations

- Center for Freethought Equality
- Congressional Progressive Caucus
- Jane Fonda Climate PAC
- Leaders We Deserve
- Our Revolution
- Peace Action
- Progressive Change Campaign Committee
- Sierra Club
- Track AIPAC
Ben McAdams

Executive branch officials

- Deb Haaland, former secretary of the interior (2021–2025)
- Martin O'Malley, former commissioner of the Social Security Administration (2023–2024)

U.S. representatives

- Greg Stanton, AZ-04 (2019–present)

State legislators

- Kathleen Riebe, state senator from the 15th district (2019–present) and former candidate for this district

Local officials

- Erin Mendenhall, mayor of Salt Lake City (2020–present)
- 6 other Salt Lake City councilmembers

Labor unions

- American Federation of Government Employees

Organizations

- League of Conservation Voters Action Fund
- NewDem Action Fund
- WelcomePAC
Liban Mohamed

U.S. representatives

- Ilhan Omar, MN-05 (2019–present)

State legislators

- Derek Kitchen, former state senator from the 2nd district (2019–2022) and former candidate for this district
- Angela Romero, minority leader of the Utah House of Representatives (2023–present) from the 25th district (2013–present)
Luis Villarreal (lost at convention)

Organizations

- Progressive Victory

==== Fundraising ====
Italics indicate a withdrawn or disqualified candidate.

Campaign finance reports as of June 3, 2026
| Candidate | Raised | Spent | Cash on hand |
|---|---|---|---|
| Nate Blouin (D) | $643,882 | $588,094 | $55,788 |
| Michael Farrell (D) | $313,062 | $274,058 | $39,004 |
| Ben McAdams (D) | $1,916,636 | $1,245,387 | $686,253 |
| Liban Mohamed (D) | $287,559 | $175,338 | $112,221 |
Source: Federal Election Commission

==== Polling ====
| Poll source | Date(s) administered | Sample size | Margin of error | Nate Blouin | Michael Farrell | Eva Lopez Chavez | Ben McAdams | Liban Mohamed | Kathleen Riebe | Undecided |
|---|---|---|---|---|---|---|---|---|---|---|
| Upswing Research (Note: Poll conducted for Blouin's campaign) | May 27–29, 2026 | 402 (LV) | ± 4.9% | 27% | 7% | – | 37% | 13% | – | 17% |
| Data for Progress (D) | March 23–26, 2026 | 381 (LV) | ± 5.0% | 23% | – | 7% | 36% | 2% | 7% | 25% |

==== Convention ====
State Democratic convention results, 2026
| Candidate | Round 1 | | Round 2 | | Round 3 | | Round 4 | | Round 5 | |
| Candidate | Votes | % | Votes | % | Votes | % | Votes | % | Votes | % |
|---|---|---|---|---|---|---|---|---|---|---|
| Liban Mohamed | 154 | 22.09% | 161 | 23.10% | 176 | 25.25% | 211 | 30.36% | 342 | 51.12% |
| Ben McAdams | 284 | 40.75% | 286 | 41.03% | 287 | 41.18% | 300 | 43.27% | 327 | 48.88% |
| Nate Blouin | 162 | 23.24% | 164 | 23.53% | 169 | 24.25% | 184 | 26.47% | Eliminated | |
| Michael Farrell | 58 | 8.32% | 60 | 8.61% | 65 | 9.33% | Eliminated | | | |
| Luis Villarreal | 26 | 3.73% | 26 | 3.73% | Eliminated | | | | | |
| Eva Lopez Chavez | 13 | 1.87% | Eliminated | | | | | | | |
| Inactive Ballots | 0 ballots | | 2 ballots | | 2 ballots | | 4 ballots | | 30 ballots | |

==== Debate ====
2026 Utah's 1st congressional district Democratic primary debate
| No. | Date | Host | Moderator | Link | Democratic | Democratic | Democratic | Democratic |
| Key: P Participant A Absent N Not invited I Invited W Withdrawn | | | | | | | | |
| Key: P Participant A Absent N Not invited I Invited W Withdrawn | | | | | Nate Blouin | Michael Farrell | Ben McAdams | Liban Mohamed |
|---|---|---|---|---|---|---|---|---|
| 1 | May 27, 2026 | PBS Utah; Utah Debate Commission | Max Roth | | P | P | P | P |

==== Results ====
Results by precinct McAdams: 30–40%; 40–50%; 50–60%; 60–70%; 70–80%; 80–90%; Blouin: 30–40%; 40–50%; 50–60%; 60–70%; Mohamed: 30–40%; 40–50%; 50–60%; 60–70%; Tie: 30-40%; 40-50%; No votes Insufficient votes

Democratic primary results
| Party | Candidate | Votes | % |
|---|---|---|---|
| Democratic | Ben McAdams | 29,737 | 51.9 |
| Democratic | Nate Blouin | 15,771 | 27.5 |
| Democratic | Liban Mohamed | 9,542 | 16.7 |
| Democratic | Michael Farrell | 2,245 | 3.9 |
| Total votes | | 57,295 | 100.0 |

=== Libertarian primary ===
==== Candidates ====
===== Filed paperwork =====
- Jesse West, attorney

=== General election ===
==== Predictions ====
| Source | Ranking | As of |
|---|---|---|
| Decision Desk HQ | Safe D (flip) | July 14, 2026 |
| The Cook Political Report | Solid D (flip) | November 11, 2025 |
| Inside Elections | Solid D (flip) | November 11, 2025 |
| Sabato's Crystal Ball | Safe D (flip) | November 11, 2025 |
| Silver Bulletin | Solid D (flip) | August 20, 2026 |

==== Polling ====
| Poll source | Date(s) administered | Sample size | Margin of error | Ben McAdams (D) | Riley Owen (R) | Other | Undecided |
|---|---|---|---|---|---|---|---|
| Lighthouse Research (Note: Poll sponsored by the Utah Debate Commission) | August 31 – September 10, 2026 | 515 (LV) | ± 4.32% | 63% | 21% | 9% (Note: Jesse West (L) with 5%; Elias Henry Montgomery (I) with 3%; "Other" with 1%) | 7% |

==== Post-primary endorsements ====
Ben McAdams (D)

Labor unions

- National Education Association
- United Mine Workers of America COMPAC

Organizations

- Democrats for Education Reform
- Jewish Democratic Council of America

==== Fundraising ====
Campaign finance reports as of June 3, 2026
| Candidate | Raised | Spent | Cash on hand |
|---|---|---|---|
| Riley Owen (R) | $98,334 | $84,658 | $13,676 |
| Ben McAdams (D) | $1,916,636 | $1,245,387 | $686,253 |
Source: Federal Election Commission

==== Debate ====
2026 Utah's 1st congressional district debate
| No. | Date | Host | Moderator | Link | Republican | Democratic |
| Key: P Participant A Absent N Not invited I Invited W Withdrawn | | | | | | |
| Key: P Participant A Absent N Not invited I Invited W Withdrawn | | | | | Riley Owen | Ben McAdams |
|---|---|---|---|---|---|---|
| 1 | Sep. 29, 2026 | Utah Debate Commission | Natalie Gochnour | YouTube | P | P |

==== Results ====
2026 Utah's 1st congressional district election
| Party | Candidate | Votes | % | ±% |
|---|---|---|---|---|
| Democratic | Ben McAdams | 165,422 | 70.31% | |
| Republican | Riley Owen | 61,230 | 26.02% | |
| Libertarian | Jesse West | 5,227 | 2.22% | |
| Unaffiliated | Elias H. Montgomery | 3,330 | 1.42% | |
| Write-in | | 71 | 0.03% | |
| Total votes | | | | |
| Democratic win (new boundaries) | | | | |

== District 2 ==
2026 Utah's 2nd congressional district election
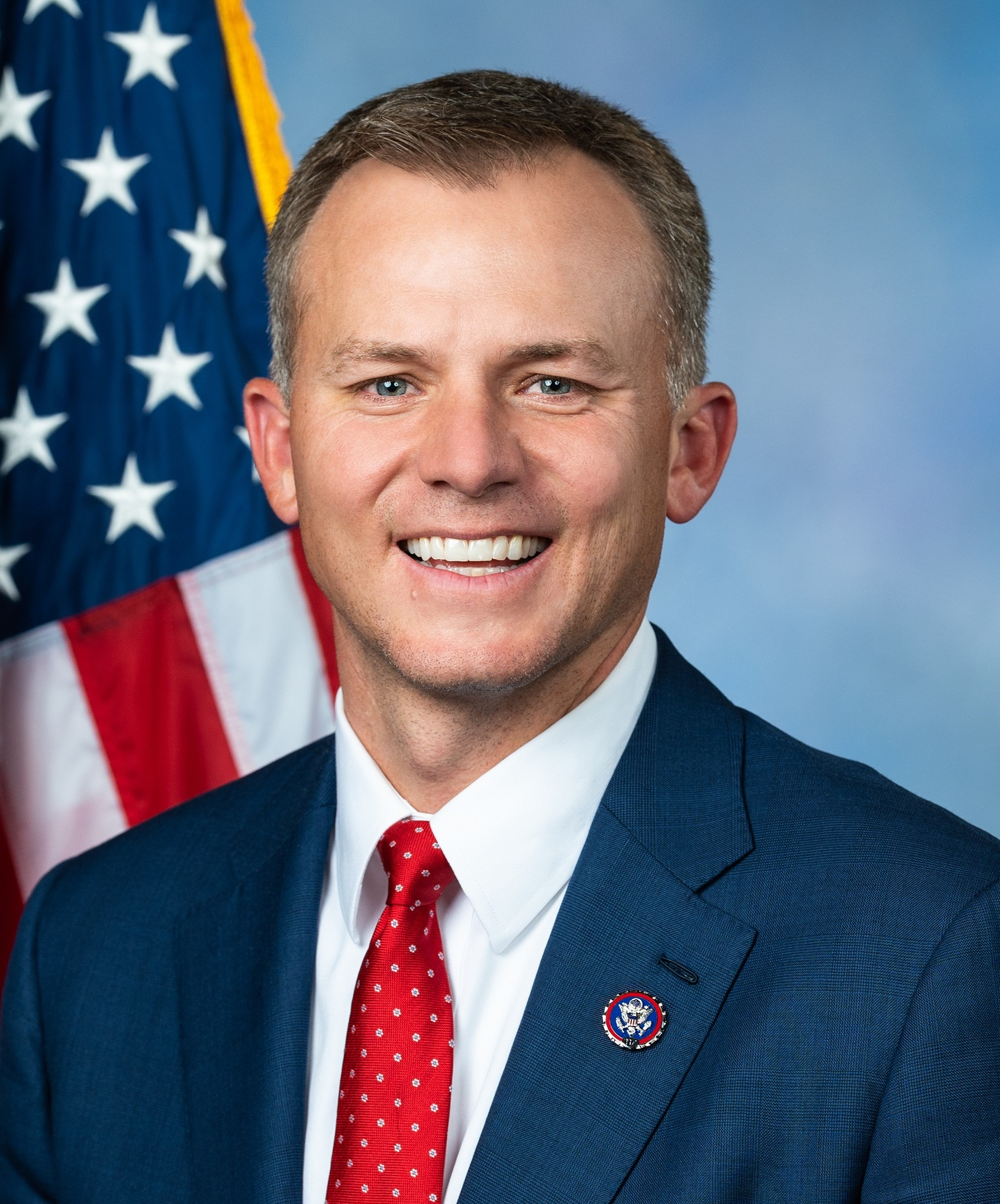

| Nominee | Blake Moore | Peter Crosby |
| Party | Republican | Democratic |
| Popular vote | 126,992 | 106,944 |
| Percentage | 50.12% | 42.21% |
U.S. Representative before election
Celeste Maloy
Republican
Elected U.S. Representative
Blake Moore
Republican

Utah's 2nd congressional district boundary from the 2026 elections Interactive map version

Under the map approved by Judge Gibson, the old 1st district essentially became the 2nd district. Like the old 1st, the new 2nd is based in northern Utah, encompassing the counties of Box Elder, Cache, Rich, Davis, and a majority of Weber, and includes the cities of Logan, Farmington, Ogden, and Brigham City, as well as Hill Air Force Base and Weber State University. The incumbent is Republican Blake Moore, who was re-elected in the 1st district with 63.1% of the vote in 2024. In the 2024 presidential election, Republican Donald Trump won the district by a 29-point margin.

=== Republican primary ===
==== Candidates ====
===== Nominee =====
- Blake Moore, incumbent U.S. representative from the 1st district

===== Eliminated in primary =====
- Karianne Lisonbee, state representative from the 14th district (2017–present)

===== Eliminated at convention =====
- Colton Hatch, pensioner

==== Endorsements ====
Karianne Lisonbee

State legislators

- 36 current and former state representatives (Note: Nelson Abbott, state representative from the 57th district (2021–present); Cheryl Acton, state representative from the 38th district (2017–present); Carl Albrecht, state representative from the 70th district (2017–present); Tiara Auxier, state representative from the 4th district (2025–present); Kera Birkeland, former state representative from the 4th district (2020–2025); Bridger Bolinder, state representative from the 29th district (2023–present); Walt Brooks, state representative from the 75th district (2016–present); Jeff Burton, state representative from the 64th district (2021–present); Kristen Chevrier, state representative from the 54th district (2025–present); Kay Christofferson, state representative from the 53rd district (2013–present); Joseph Elison, state representative from the 72nd district (2023–present); Stephanie Gricius, state representative from the 50th district (2023–present); Leah Hansen, state representative from the 51st district (2025–present); Jon Hawkins, state representative from the 55th district (2019–present); Colin Jack, state representative from the 73rd district (2022–present); Jason Kyle, state representative from the 8th district (2023–present); Trevor Lee, state representative from the 16th district (2023–present); Anthony Loubet, state representative from the 27th district (2023–present); Matt MacPherson, state representative from the 26th district (2023–present); Cory Maloy, state representative from the 52nd district (2017–present); Logan Monson, state representative from the 69th district (2025–present); Nicholeen Peck, state representative from the 28th district (2025–present); Mike Petersen, state representative from the 2nd district (2021–present); Candice Pierucci, state representative from the 49th district (2019–present); Calvin Roberts, state representative from the 46th district (2025–present); Jake Sawyer, state representative from the 9th district (2025–present); David Shallenberger, state representative from the 58th district (2025–present); Troy Shelley, state representative from the 66th district (2025–present); Lisa Shepherd, state representative from the 61st district (2025–present); Rex Shipp, state representative from the 71st district (2019–present); Mark Strong, state representative from the 47th district (2019–present); Jordan Teuscher, state representative from the 44th district (2021–present); Norm Thurston, state representative from the 62nd district (2015–present); R. Neil Walter, state representative from the 74th district (2023–present); Christine Watkins, state representative from the 67th district (2009–2012, 2017–present); Stephen Whyte, state representative from the 63rd district (2021–present))
- Heidi Balderree, state senator from the 22nd district (2023–present)
- Brady Brammer, state senator from the 21st district (2025–present)
- John Johnson, state senator from the 3rd district (2021–present)
- Daniel McCay, state senator from the 18th district (2019–present)
- Mike Schultz, speaker of the Utah House of Representatives (2023–present) from the 12th district (2015–present)
- Casey Snider, majority leader of the Utah House of Representatives (2025–present) from the 5th district (2018–present)
- Keven Stratton, state senator from the 24th district (2025–present)

Organizations

- Turning Point Action
Blake Moore

Executive branch officials

- Donald Trump, president of the United States (2017–2021, 2025–present)

U.S. representatives

- Mike Johnson, speaker of the House (2023–present) from LA-04 (2017–present)
- Jim Jordan, OH-04 (2007–present)

State legislators

- Stuart Adams, president of the Utah Senate (2019–present) from the 7th district (2009–present)
- 12+ other state legislators

Organizations

- Log Cabin Republicans

==== Fundraising ====
Campaign finance reports as of June 3, 2026
| Candidate | Raised | Spent | Cash on hand |
|---|---|---|---|
| Blake Moore (R) | $2,286,492 | $1,871,107 | $1,949,408 |
| Karianne Lisonbee (R) | $177,920 | $118,365 | $59,556 |
Source: Federal Election Commission

==== Polling ====
| Poll source | Date(s) administered | Sample size | Margin of error | Colton Hatch | Karianne Lisonbee | Blake Moore | Undecided |
|---|---|---|---|---|---|---|---|
| The Tarrance Group (R) (Note: Poll sponsored by Moore's campaign) | May 11–14, 2026 | 404 (LV) | ± 4.9% | – | 29% | 63% | 7% |
| The Tarrance Group (R) | March 23–26, 2026 | 308 (LV) | ± 5.8% | 14% | 14% | 61% | 11% |

==== Convention ====
State Republican convention results, 2026
| Candidate | Round 1 | |
| Candidate | Votes | % |
|---|---|---|
| Karianne Lisonbee | 552 | 61.54% |
| Blake Moore | 302 | 33.67% |
| Steve Fonua | 43 | 4.79% |
| Inactive Ballots | 0 ballots | |

==== Debate ====
2026 Utah's 2nd congressional district Republican primary debate
| No. | Date | Host | Moderator | Link | Republican | Republican |
| Key: P Participant A Absent N Not invited I Invited W Withdrawn | | | | | | |
| Key: P Participant A Absent N Not invited I Invited W Withdrawn | | | | | Karianne Lisonbee | Blake Moore |
|---|---|---|---|---|---|---|
| 1 | Jun. 1, 2026 | Utah Debate Commission | Glen Mills | | P | P |

==== Results ====
Republican primary results
| Party | Candidate | Votes | % |
|---|---|---|---|
| Republican | Blake Moore (incumbent) | 52,673 | 56.7 |
| Republican | Karianne Lisonbee | 40,271 | 43.3 |
| Total votes | | 92,944 | 100.0 |

=== Democratic primary ===
==== Candidates ====
===== Nominee =====
- Peter Crosby, project manager

===== Eliminated at convention =====
- Jarom Gillins, tradesman
- Ian Parrish
- Tyler Farnsworth, mental health nurse practitioner

==== Fundraising ====
Campaign finance reports as of March 31, 2026
| Candidate | Raised | Spent | Cash on hand |
|---|---|---|---|
| Peter Crosby (D) | $20,737 | $11,308 | $3,896 |
Source: Federal Election Commission

==== Convention ====
State Democratic convention results, 2026
| Candidate | Round 1 | |
| Candidate | Votes | % |
|---|---|---|
| Peter Crosby | 281 | 76.57% |
| Tyler Farnsworth | 56 | 15.26% |
| Jarom Gillins | 19 | 5.18% |
| Ian Parrish | 11 | 3.00% |
| Inactive Ballots | 0 ballots | |

=== General election ===
==== Predictions ====
| Source | Ranking | As of |
|---|---|---|
| Decision Desk HQ | Safe R | July 14, 2026 |
| The Cook Political Report | Solid R | November 11, 2025 |
| Inside Elections | Solid R | November 11, 2025 |
| Sabato's Crystal Ball | Safe R | November 11, 2025 |
| Silver Bulletin | Solid R | August 20, 2026 |

==== Fundraising ====
Campaign finance reports as of June 3, 2026
| Candidate | Raised | Spent | Cash on hand |
|---|---|---|---|
| Blake Moore (R) | $2,286,492 | $1,871,107 | $1,949,408 |
| Peter Crosby (D) | $20,737 | $11,309 | $3,896 |
Source: Federal Election Commission

==== Polling ====
| Poll source | Date(s) administered | Sample size | Margin of error | Blake Moore (R) | Peter Crosby (D) | Other | Undecided |
|---|---|---|---|---|---|---|---|
| Crosby for Congress (D) | September 21–23, 2026 | 657 (LV) | ± 3.8% | 32% | 35% | 10% (Note: "None of the Above" with 7%; "Other" with 3%) | 23% |
| Lighthouse Research | September 10–24, 2026 | 515 (LV) | ± 4.32% | 39% | 34% | 17% (Note: Daniel Cottam (L) & Robert Moesinger (I) with 5%; Carlton Bowen (IA) with 4%; "Other" with 3%) | 11% |
| Crosby for Congress (D) | September 8–10, 2026 | 762 (RV) | ± 4.0% | 32% | 31% | 12% (Note: "None of the Above" with 9%; "Other" with 3%) | 25% |

==== Debate ====
2026 Utah's 2nd congressional district debate
| No. | Date | Host | Moderator | Link | Republican | Democratic |
| Key: P Participant A Absent N Not invited I Invited W Withdrawn | | | | | | |
| Key: P Participant A Absent N Not invited I Invited W Withdrawn | | | | | Blake Moore | Peter Crosby |
|---|---|---|---|---|---|---|
| 1 | Oct. 13, 2026 | Utah Debate Commission | Heidi Hatch | YouTube | P | P |

==== Results ====
2026 Utah's 2nd congressional district election
| Party | Candidate | Votes | % | ±% |
|---|---|---|---|---|
| Republican | Blake Moore (incumbent) | 126,992 | 50.12% | |
| Democratic | Peter Crosby | 106,944 | 42.21% | |
| Utah Independent American Party | Carlton Bowen | 8,402 | 3.32% | |
| Unaffiliated | Robert Moesinger | 6,502 | 2.57% | |
| Libertarian | Daniel Cottam | 4,546 | 1.79% | |
| Total votes | | | | |
| Republican hold | | | | |

== District 3 ==
2026 Utah's 3rd congressional district election
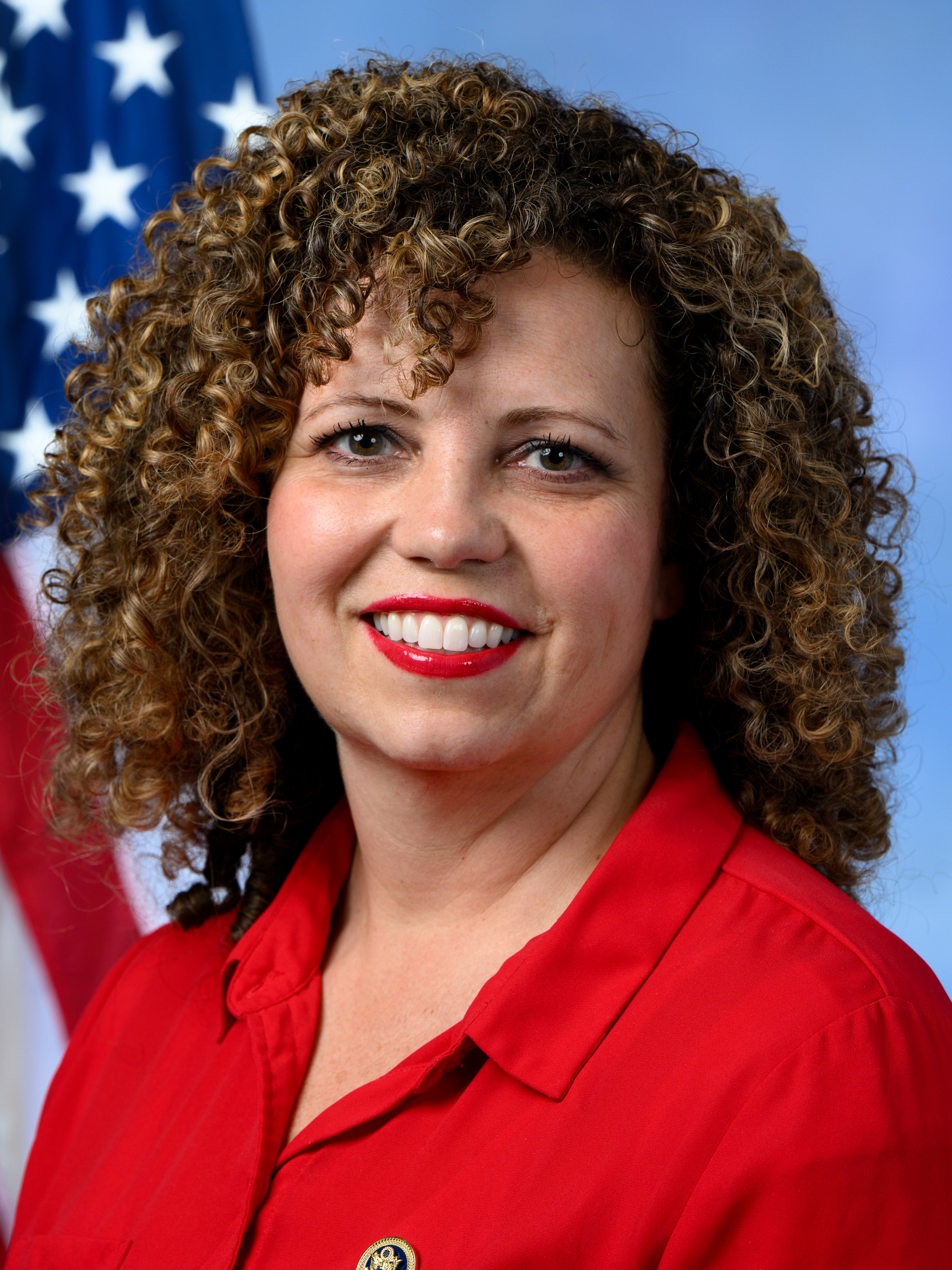

| Nominee | Celeste Maloy | Kent Udell |
| Party | Republican | Democratic |
| Popular vote | 143,151 | 87,765 |
| Percentage | 57.23% | 35.09% |
U.S. Representative before election
Mike Kennedy
Republican
Elected U.S. Representative
Celeste Maloy
Republican

Utah's 3rd congressional district boundary from the 2026 elections Interactive map version

The new district is based in eastern and southern Utah, encompassing a majority of the state's counties and portions of Utah and Weber counties, and includes the cities of Cedar City, St. George, Provo, Price, Orem, and Heber, as well as Brigham Young University. The incumbent is Republican Celeste Maloy, who was re-elected in the 2nd district with 58.0% of the vote in 2024. In the 2024 presidential election, Republican Donald Trump won the district by a 41-point margin.

=== Republican primary ===
==== Candidates ====
===== Nominee =====
- Celeste Maloy, incumbent U.S. representative from the 2nd district

===== Eliminated in primary =====
- Phil Lyman, former state representative from the 69th district (2019–2024) and candidate for governor in 2024

===== Eliminated at convention =====
- David Harris
- Tyler Murset

===== Declined =====
- Mike Kennedy, incumbent U.S. representative (running in the 4th district)

==== Endorsements ====
Endorsements in bold were made after the primary elections.

Celeste Maloy

Executive branch officials

- Donald Trump, 45th and 47th president of the United States (2017–2021, 2025–present)

U.S. representatives

- Burgess Owens, UT-04

State legislators

- Stuart Adams, president of the Utah Senate (2019–present) from the 7th district (2009–present)
- Carl Albrecht, state representative from the 70th district (2017–present)
- Bridger Bolinder, state representative from the 29th district (2023–present)
- Walt Brooks, state representative from the 75th district (2016–present)
- Paul Cutler, state representative from the 18th district (2023–present)
- David Hinkins, state senator from the 26th district (2009–present)
- Don Ipson, state senator from the 29th district (2016–present)
- Colin Jack, state representative from the 73rd district (2022–present)
- Anthony Loubet, state representative from the 27th district (2023–present)
- Steven Lund, former state representative from the 21st district (2021–2024)
- Mike McKell, state senator from the 25th district (2021–present)
- Derrin Owens, state senator from the 27th district (2021–present)
- Scott Sandall, state senator from the 1st district (2019–present)
- Rex Shipp, state representative from the 71st district (2019–present)
- Keven Stratton, state senator from the 24th district (2025–present)
- Evan Vickers, majority leader of the Utah Senate (2019–present) from the 28th district (2013–present)
- R. Neil Walter, state representative from the 74th district (2023–present)
- Todd Weiler, state senator from the 8th district (2012–present)
- Doug Welton, state representative from the 65th district (2021–present)

Organizations

- **Log Cabin Republicans**

==== Fundraising ====
Campaign finance reports as of June 3, 2026
| Candidate | Raised | Spent | Cash on hand |
|---|---|---|---|
| Celeste Maloy (R) | $1,177,361 | $1,028,321 | $256,062 |
| Phil Lyman (R) | $38,622 | $43,486 | $7,714 |
Source: Federal Election Commission

==== Convention ====
State Republican convention results, 2026
| Candidate | Round 1 | | Round 2 | |
| Candidate | Votes | % | Votes | % |
|---|---|---|---|---|
| Celeste Maloy | **515** | **50.00%** | **482** | **50.95%** |
| Phil Lyman | **486** | **47.18%** | **464** | **49.05%** |
| Tyler Murset | 27 | 2.62% | Eliminated | |
| David Harris | 2 | 0.19% | Eliminated | |
| Inactive Ballots | 0 ballots | | 84 ballots | |

==== Debate ====
2026 Utah's 3rd congressional district Republican primary debate
| No. | Date | Host | Moderator | Link | Republican | Republican |
| Key: P Participant A Absent N Not invited I Invited W Withdrawn | | | | | | |
| Key: P Participant A Absent N Not invited I Invited W Withdrawn | | | | | Phil Lyman | Celeste Maloy |
|---|---|---|---|---|---|---|
| 1 | Jun. 1, 2026 | Utah Debate Commission | Thomas Wright | | **P** | **P** |

==== Results ====
Republican primary results
| Party | Candidate | Votes | % |
|---|---|---|---|
| **Republican** | **Celeste Maloy (incumbent)** | **67,135** | **65.7** |
| Republican | Phil Lyman | 35,034 | 34.3 |
| Total votes | | **102,169** | **100.0** |

=== Democratic primary ===
==== Candidates ====
===== Nominee =====
- Kent Udell, engineer and cousin of former U.S. Interior Secretary Stewart Udall

===== Eliminated at convention =====
- Steve Merrill, nominee for state representative in 2024

==== Fundraising ====
Campaign finance reports as of March 31, 2026
| Candidate | Raised | Spent | Cash on hand |
|---|---|---|---|
| Steve Merrill (D) | $21,088 | $20,327 | $760 |
Source: Federal Election Commission

==== Convention ====
State Democratic convention results, 2026
| Candidate | Round 1 | |
| Candidate | Votes | % |
|---|---|---|
| Kent Udell | **190** | **56.55%** |
| Steve Merrill | 146 | 43.45% |
| Inactive Ballots | 0 ballots | |

=== General election ===
==== Predictions ====
| Source | Ranking | As of |
|---|---|---|
| Decision Desk HQ | Safe R | July 14, 2026 |
| The Cook Political Report | Solid R | November 11, 2025 |
| Inside Elections | Solid R | November 11, 2025 |
| Sabato's Crystal Ball | Safe R | November 11, 2025 |
| Silver Bulletin | Solid R | August 20, 2026 |

==== Polling ====
| Poll source | Date(s) administered | Sample size | Margin of error | Celeste Maloy (R) | Kent Udell (D) | Other | Undecided |
|---|---|---|---|---|---|---|---|
| Lighthouse Research | September 2–15, 2026 | 508 (LV) | ± 4.35% | **45%** | 26% | 14% (Note: Michael Stoddard (L) with 7%; Cassie Easley (C) & Ayden Scott (I) with 3%; "Other" with 1%; Adonis Hooslyn (I) with 0%) | 16% |

==== Fundraising ====
Campaign finance reports as of June 3, 2026
| Candidate | Raised | Spent | Cash on hand |
|---|---|---|---|
| Celeste Maloy (R) | $1,177,361 | $1,028,321 | $256,062 |
| Kent Udell (D) | $14,010 | $3,380 | $10,630 |
Source: Federal Election Commission

==== Post-primary endorsements ====
Kent Udell (D)

Labor unions

- United Mine Workers of America COMPAC

==== Debate ====
2026 Utah's 3rd congressional district debate
| No. | Date | Host | Moderator | Link | Republican | Democratic |
| Key: P Participant A Absent N Not invited I Invited W Withdrawn | | | | | | |
| Key: P Participant A Absent N Not invited I Invited W Withdrawn | | | | | Celeste Maloy | Kent Udell |
|---|---|---|---|---|---|---|
| 1 | Oct. 2, 2026 | Utah Debate Commission | Bob Evans | YouTube | **P** | **P** |

==== Results ====
2026 Utah's 3rd congressional district election
| Party | Candidate | Votes | % | ±% |
|---|---|---|---|---|
| **Republican** | **Celeste Maloy (incumbent)** | **144,009** | **57.1%** | |
| Democratic | Kent Udell | 89,087 | 35.29% | |
| Constitution | Cassie Easley | 7,884 | 3.12% | |
| Libertarian | Michael Stoddard | 5,602 | 2.22% | |
| Total votes | | | | |

== District 4 ==
2026 Utah's 4th congressional district election
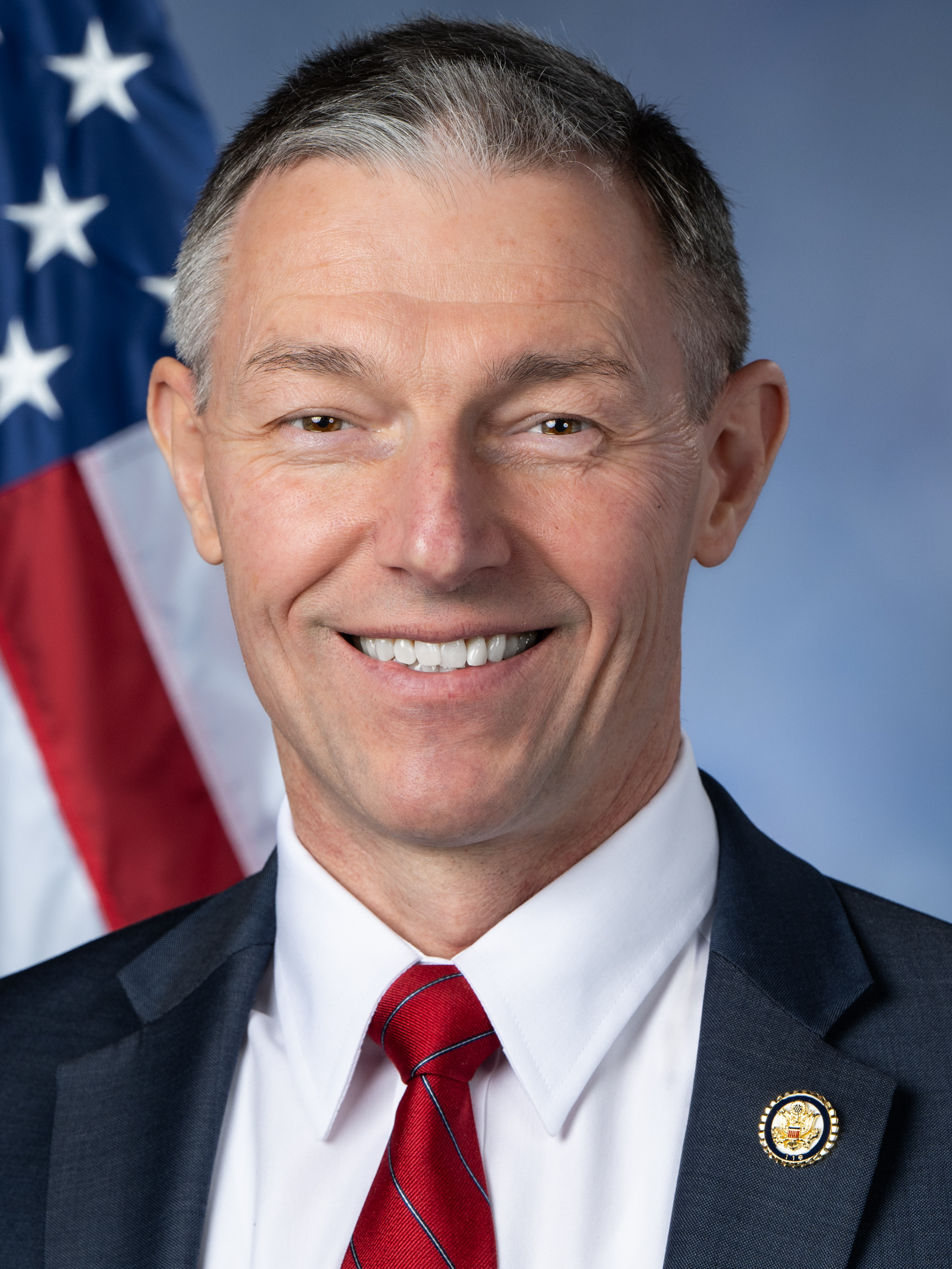

| Nominee | Mike Kennedy | Jonny Larsen |
| Party | Republican | Democratic |
| Popular vote | 137,086 | 98,946 |
| Percentage | 53.73% | 38.78% |
U.S. Representative before election
Burgess Owens
Republican
Elected U.S. Representative
Mike Kennedy
Republican

Utah's 4th congressional district boundary from the 2026 elections Interactive map version

The new district is based in western Utah, encompassing the counties of Tooele, Juab, Millard, Sanpete, Sevier, and portions of Salt Lake County and Utah County, and includes the cities of Draper, Sandy, Tooele, and South Jordan. Due to redistricting, the district has two incumbents: Republican Burgess Owens, who was re-elected with 63.4% of the vote in 2024, and Republican Mike Kennedy, who was elected in the 3rd district with 66.4% of the vote in 2024. Owens announced in March 2026 that he would not seek re-election. In the 2024 presidential election, Republican Donald Trump won the district by a 32-point margin.

=== Republican primary ===
==== Candidates ====
===== Nominee =====
- Mike Kennedy, incumbent U.S. representative for the 3rd district

===== Eliminated at convention =====
- Isaiah Hardman
- Scott Hatfield, businessman and candidate for the 2nd district in 2023
- Tyrone Jensen, small business owner and perennial candidate
- Seth Stewart, poll worker

===== Withdrawn =====
- Burgess Owens, incumbent U.S. representative

==== Endorsements ====
Mike Kennedy

Executive branch officials

- Donald Trump, President of the United States (2017–2021, 2025–present)

==== Fundraising ====
Italics indicate a withdrawn candidate.

Campaign finance reports as of March 31, 2026
| Candidate | Raised | Spent | Cash on hand |
|---|---|---|---|
| Burgess Owens (R) | $704,914 | $675,905 | $162,437 |
| Mike Kennedy (R) | $802,218 | $556,573 | $370,846 |
Source: Federal Election Commission

==== Convention ====
State Republican convention results, 2026
| Candidate | Round 1 | |
| Candidate | Votes | % |
|---|---|---|
| Mike Kennedy | 753 | 78.68% |
| Scott Hatfield | 105 | 10.97% |
| Seth Stewart | 50 | 5.22% |
| Isaiah Hardman | 36 | 3.76% |
| Tyrone Jensen | 13 | 1.36% |
| Inactive Ballots | 0 ballots | |

=== Democratic primary ===
==== Candidates ====
===== Nominee =====
- Jonny Larsen, U.S. Marine Corps veteran

===== Eliminated at convention =====
- Archie Williams III, perennial candidate

==== Endorsements ====
Jonny Larsen

Organizations

- Center for Freethought Equality

==== Fundraising ====
Campaign finance reports as of March 31, 2026
| Candidate | Raised | Spent | Cash on hand |
|---|---|---|---|
| Jonny Larsen (D) | $32,783 | $29,807 | $2,975 |
Source: Federal Election Commission

==== Convention ====
State Democratic convention results, 2026
| Candidate | Round 1 | |
| Candidate | Votes | % |
|---|---|---|
| Jonny Larsen | 262 | 94.93% |
| Archie Williams | 14 | 5.07% |
| Inactive Ballots | 0 ballots | |

=== Independents ===
==== Candidates ====
===== Filed paperwork =====
- Steven Burt, attorney

==== Fundraising ====
Campaign finance reports as of March 31, 2026
| Candidate | Raised | Spent | Cash on hand |
|---|---|---|---|
| Steven Burt (I) | $26,904 | $24,385 | $2,518 |
Source: Federal Election Commission

=== General election ===
==== Predictions ====
| Source | Ranking | As of |
|---|---|---|
| Decision Desk HQ | Safe R | July 14, 2026 |
| The Cook Political Report | Solid R | November 11, 2025 |
| Inside Elections | Solid R | November 11, 2025 |
| Sabato's Crystal Ball | Safe R | November 11, 2025 |
| Silver Bulletin | Solid R | August 20, 2026 |

==== Post-primary endorsements ====
Mike Kennedy (R)

Organizations

- U.S. Chamber of Commerce

==== Fundraising ====
Campaign finance reports as of June 3, 2026
| Candidate | Raised | Spent | Cash on hand |
|---|---|---|---|
| Mike Kennedy (R) | $802,219 | $556,574 | $370,847 |
| Jonny Larsen (D) | $34,363 | $29,757 | $4,506 |
Source: Federal Election Commission

==== Polling ====
| Poll source | Date(s) administered | Sample size | Margin of error | Mike Kennedy (R) | Jonny Larsen (D) | Other | Undecided |
|---|---|---|---|---|---|---|---|
| Lighthouse Research | September 8–17, 2026 | 513 (LV) | ± 4.32% | 42% | 33% | 14% (Note: Steven Burt (I) with 6%; Taylor Wright (L) with 5%; "Other" with 3%) | 12% |

==== Debate ====
2026 Utah's 4th congressional district debate
| No. | Date | Host | Moderator | Link | Republican | Democratic |
| Key: P Participant A Absent N Not invited I Invited W Withdrawn | | | | | | |
| Key: P Participant A Absent N Not invited I Invited W Withdrawn | | | | | Mike Kennedy | Jonny Larsen |
|---|---|---|---|---|---|---|
| 1 | Oct. 8, 2026 | Utah Debate Commission | Doug Wilks | YouTube | P | P |

==== Results ====
2026 Utah's 4th congressional district election
| Party | Candidate | Votes | % | ±% |
|---|---|---|---|---|
| Republican | Mike Kennedy (incumbent) | 144,089 | 53.1% | |
| Democratic | Jonny Larsen | 106,593 | 39.3% | |
| Independent | Steven Burt | 11,735 | 4.3% | |
| Libertarian | Taylor Wright | 8,819 | 3.3% | |
| Total votes | | | | |
| Republican hold | | | | |

== Notes ==
Partisan clients
