= Ben McAdams =

American politician and attorney (born 1974)

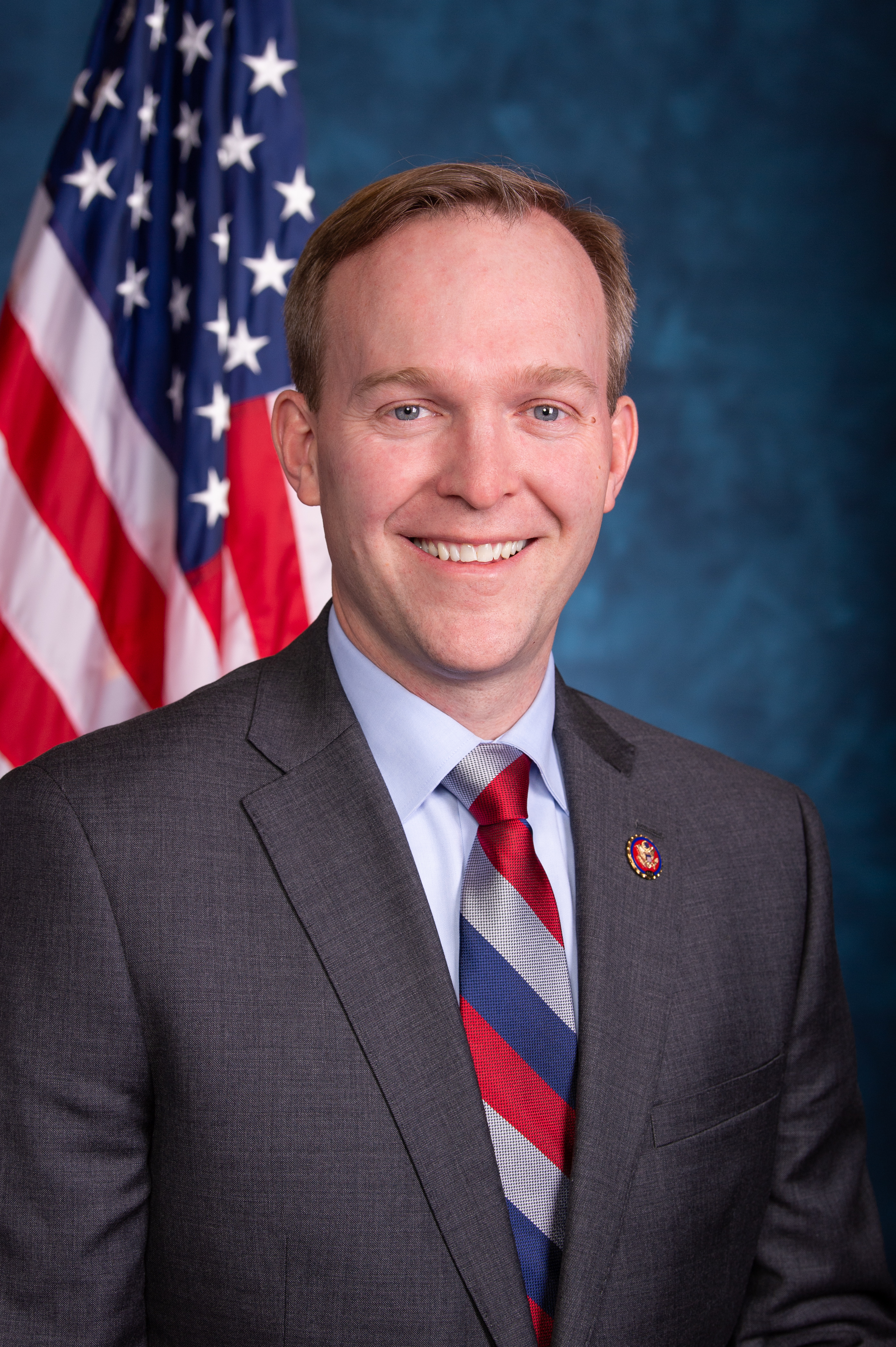
- Official portrait, 2019

Member-elect of the U.S. House of Representatives from Utah
- Assuming office January 3, 2027
- Succeeding: Blake Moore (redistricted)
- Constituency: 1st district
- In office January 3, 2019 – January 3, 2021
- Preceded by: Mia Love
- Succeeded by: Burgess Owens
- Constituency: 4th district

Mayor of Salt Lake County
- In office January 7, 2013 – January 2, 2019
- Deputy: Nichole Dunn
- Preceded by: Peter Corroon
- Succeeded by: Jenny Wilson

Member of the Utah State Senate from the 2nd district
- In office December 19, 2009 – November 13, 2012
- Preceded by: Scott McCoy
- Succeeded by: Jim Dabakis

Personal details
- Born: Benjamin Michael McAdams; December 5, 1974 (age 51) West Bountiful, Utah, U.S.
- Party: Democratic
- Spouse: Julie McAdams
- Children: 4
- Education: University of Utah (BA); Columbia University (JD)
- Website: Campaign website
- McAdams's voice McAdams on suicide prevention. Recorded June 12, 2019

Benjamin Michael McAdams (born December 5, 1974) is an American politician and attorney who is the United States representative-elect from Utah's 1st congressional district. He previously served as the U.S. representative from Utah's 4th congressional district from 2019 to 2021. McAdams will return to the House on January 3, 2027, this time representing Utah's 1st congressional district, after winning the 2026 election over Republican nominee Riley Owen.

From 2013 to 2019, he served as mayor of Salt Lake County, and from 2009 to 2012, he was the Utah state senator from the 2nd district, which includes Salt Lake City, South Salt Lake, and a portion of West Valley. McAdams was elected to Congress in 2018, narrowly defeating two-term Republican incumbent Mia Love. In 2020, McAdams ran for reelection, but he lost to Republican challenger Burgess Owens. He is the most recent Democrat to represent Utah in Congress, and during his tenure, was the only Democratic member of Utah's congressional delegation.

== Early life and education ==
McAdams was born in West Bountiful, Utah. He has a bachelor's degree in political science from the University of Utah and a J.D. with honors from Columbia Law School. At Columbia, McAdams was a member of the Columbia Human Rights Law Review.

== Early career ==
=== Legal career ===
After graduating from law school, McAdams briefly worked in New York City as an associate at the law firm Davis Polk & Wardwell. McAdams and his family then returned to Utah, where he joined the law firm Dorsey & Whitney in Salt Lake City, working in securities law. McAdams then became Senior Advisor to Salt Lake City Mayor Ralph Becker.

McAdams has served as an adjunct faculty member at the University of Utah College of Law.

=== Utah state senator ===
McAdams was elected to replace Scott McCoy as the senator for Utah's second district in a special election on December 19, 2009. He was elected to a four-year term on November 2, 2010.

==== Legislation ====
In March 2011, McAdams proposed a bill banning employment and housing discrimination against gay and transgender Utahns. His attempt to advance the bill failed on a party-line vote. At the time, he stated the ideas in the bill had "proven to be a success" in cities that had adopted similar measures. Salt Lake City passed a similar measure in 2009.

==== Scorecards and ratings ====
McAdams received a 75% rating from the advocacy group Parents for Choice in Education during the 2012 legislative session and a 77% rating from the National Education Association. He also received an 82% score from the Utah Taxpayers Association, the highest-scoring Democrat that year. The Salt Lake Tribune identified McAdams as the most liberal-leaning member of the Utah Senate in 2011; the next year, however, the Tribune identified him as the third-most conservative Democratic Utah state senator out of eight.

McAdams was given a rating of 33% by the Sutherland Institute, a fiscally and socially conservative political action committee, based on his time in the Utah state senate. He also has a 100% rating from the Utah Sierra Club, which supports greater environmental protection.

=== Mayoralty (2013-2019) ===
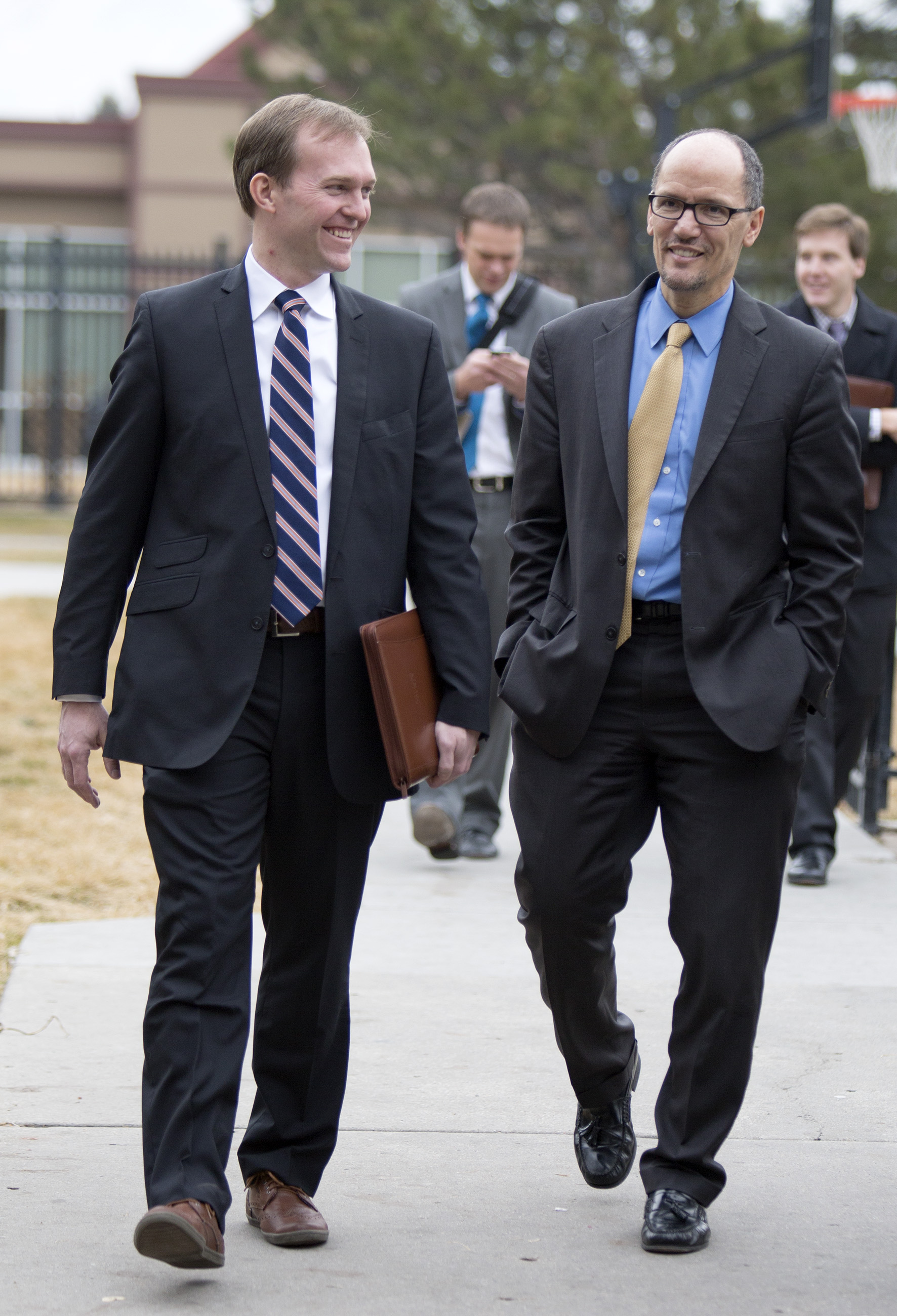
McAdams and Secretary of Labor Tom Perez in Salt Lake City on January 30, 2015

==== Elections ====
In November 2011, McAdams announced his campaign to succeed Peter Corroon as mayor of Salt Lake County, Utah. McAdams was elected, on November 6, 2012, defeating Republican nominee Mark Crockett 54% to 45%. McAdams resigned from the state senate before taking office as mayor.

McAdams was mentioned as a potential candidate in Utah's 2016 Senate race or Utah's 2016 gubernatorial race, but did not run for either position. He was reelected to a second term as Salt Lake County Mayor in November 2016 59% to 41%.

==== Homelessness ====
McAdams was tasked by the Utah Legislature to select a location for a new homeless shelter in Salt Lake County, outside of Salt Lake City. According to the Deseret News, the task was considered politically damaging, as strong local opposition was expected regardless of the ultimate shelter location. McAdams recommended South Salt Lake, and was opposed by Cherie Wood, the city's mayor. Previously, Draper mayor Troy Walker had volunteered two sites for the shelter in Draper, before rescinding the offer under public pressure.

Before making his recommendation, McAdams spent two nights on the streets of Salt Lake City, posing as a homeless person to gather information. Although tasked with recommending a site for the shelter, McAdams pledged to not support the center's groundbreaking unless the Utah Legislature passes a bill to create a pool of revenue from other cities to help with funding.

McAdams has called for a "radically different approach ... to address homelessness", and has called homelessness a "stubborn and complex social challenge".

==== Taxes and budgets ====
In 2014, McAdams supported the renewal of a Zoos, Arts, and Parks (ZAP) tax in Salt Lake County. The ZAP tax amounts to 1 cent on every $10 spent. It partially funds more than 190 county arts and cultural organizations, as well as 30 parks and recreation facilities, including Hogle Zoo, Tracy Aviary, the Loveland Living Planet Aquarium, and others. The tax was approved by voters in 2014, with nearly 77% of county voters in favor.

==== Economic and community development ====
McAdams supported a Utah bill that gave Salt Lake County's townships the power to decide their future governance structure. This led to the election in which Millcreek residents voted to incorporate.

McAdams opposed a proposed Facebook data center in West Jordan in 2016. West Jordan city leaders blamed opposition from Salt Lake County, and McAdams in particular, for Facebook's ultimate choice to locate the data center in New Mexico instead of West Jordan. The $2.5 billion data center would have received $195 million from the city and county in tax breaks. McAdams believed that the data center was too expensive, since it would have directly produced a maximum of only 130 jobs. Supporters of the data center argued it would have drawn additional development and investment to the region.

Salt Lake County maintained an AAA bond rating throughout McAdams's tenure as mayor.

== United States Representative ==
=== Elections ===
==== 2018 ====
On October 18, 2017, McAdams announced that he would seek the Democratic nomination to oppose incumbent Representative Mia Love, a Republican representing Utah's 4th congressional district. On April 28, 2018, McAdams won the Democratic nomination at the party's convention. With the backing of 72% of the convention delegates, McAdams avoided a primary campaign.

Under pressure from Love's campaign, McAdams stated that he would not support Nancy Pelosi for Speaker if elected.

In June 2018, CNN reported that the race was considered "consequential to both parties" because Love had "stood up to [President Donald Trump] on immigration" and "because national Democrats [saw] McAdams as one of their best chances to gain a foothold on red turf".

McAdams was endorsed by the Blue Dog Coalition, a House caucus of conservative and moderate Democrats that stresses fiscal responsibility. He was also endorsed by the League of Conservation Voters

On November 20, final results showed that McAdams had won by 694 votes, or .257%. His margin of victory was greater than the .25% needed to automatically trigger a recount. About $11.4 million combined was spent by Love's and McAdams' campaigns, and outside groups on their behalf, making it one of the most expensive campaigns in Utah history.

With his win, McAdams became the first Democratic member of Congress elected from Utah since Jim Matheson won reelection to the 4th district in 2012.

==== 2020 ====
McAdams was challenged by Republican Burgess Owens, a former NFL player and frequent contributor on Fox News. A United Utah Party candidate, Jonia Broderick, dropped out in October and endorsed McAdams.

Outside groups spent heavily to oppose McAdams. On November 17 the election was called for Burgess Owens, with a margin less than 1%. Owens won the election by overperforming in traditionally Democratic Salt Lake County, and he ultimately defeated McAdams by approximately 3,000 votes, a larger margin than McAdams won by in 2018. The election was one of the closest House races in the country in 2020, as it was not officially called until thirteen days after Election Day.

==== 2026 ====
After the Third District Judge Dianna Gibson ruled in August 2025 that Utah's current congressional maps were unfairly drawn to favor Republicans and that the maps had to be redrawn by the legislature, McAdams was one of several potential contenders for the newly redrawn 1st district, which was centered around Salt Lake County. McAdams announced his run on November 13.

The new 1st was overwhelmingly Democratic; it included the most Democratic portions of Salt Lake County. In November 2025, Politico speculated that the relatively moderate McAdams could struggle in the Democratic primary, the real contest in the deep-blue 1st district. However, McAdams was the first to gather the necessary signatures to appear on the primary ballot and led other Democratic candidates in fundraising through the end of 2025. He also led in polling among the Democratic field through March 2026. On June 23, 2026, McAdams won the Democratic nomination in a four-way primary, all but assuring his return to Congress. In the November 3, 2026 general election, McAdams defeated Republican candidate Riley Owen with over 70 percent of the vote.

=== Tenure ===
McAdams was the only Democrat in Utah's congressional delegation during the 116th Congress.

Following attacks from Mia Love during the 2018 campaign, seeking to tie McAdams to House speaker Nancy Pelosi, McAdams voted for Stephanie Murphy, a Democratic representative from Florida, for House speaker.

McAdams was one of over 100 members of Congress who asked to have their pay withheld during the 2018–19 United States federal government shutdown.

In April 2019, McAdams introduced legislation proposing a Balanced Budget Amendment to the U.S. Constitution. He was supported by the other 26 members of the Blue Dog Caucus. The amendment would have allowed deficits during wars, recessions, or sustained periods of high unemployment. It would have also protected Social Security and Medicare from court-mandated budget cuts. As justification for the amendment, McAdams cited the $22 trillion debt, $1 trillion annual deficit, increasing interest payments, and lack of efforts by either party to curtail spending growth. Liberal-leaning news sources criticized the plan.

McAdams introduced a bill to help victims of Ponzi schemes recover their money. On November 18, 2019, it passed the House of Representatives with bipartisan support. Utah has the highest number of known Ponzi schemes per capita in the United States.

McAdams introduced an amendment to a funding bill to prevent resumption of nuclear weapons testing, which passed the House in July 2019.

=== Committee assignments ===
==== 116th Congress ====
- Committee on Financial Services
  - Subcommittee on Consumer Protection and Financial Institutions
  - Subcommittee on National Security, International Development and Monetary Policy
- Committee on Science, Space, and Technology
  - Subcommittee on Environment
  - Subcommittee on Research and Technology

=== Caucus memberships ===
==== 116th Congress ====
- Blue Dog Coalition
- Congressional LGBT Equality Caucus
- New Democrat Coalition
- Problem Solvers Caucus

== Political positions ==
Ahead of 2018 and 2020 elections, McAdams described himself as a moderate Democrat. He emphasized his efforts to work with Republicans, and said he believed it is important to work together to solve problems. Politico, however, described McAdams as a conservative Democrat, and according to the UCLA Department of Political Science's DW-NOMINATE scores, McAdams was the most conservative Democrat in the 116th House.

Ahead of the 2026 election, Utah Governor Cox stated that McAdams had taken positions further to the left as a result of the redistricting. In announcing his run, however, McAdams noted "I haven't changed. People know that I'll work with anyone to get results", and urged the Democratic Party to be more inclusive of diverse viewpoints.

=== Abortion ===
As a Utah state senator, McAdams opposed a bill to increase the waiting period for abortions from 24 to 72 hours, a bill mandating biannual inspections of abortion clinics, a bill requiring doctors to describe ultrasound images to patients, and a bill that would have allowed health care providers to refuse to perform abortions on religious grounds. As such, he received a 100% rating from the pro-choice Planned Parenthood Action Council of Utah for his time as a state senator (2011–2012). In 2018, however, under fire from Love's campaign, he said he voted against the anti-abortion bills because he considered them poorly written and was concerned about their unintended legal consequences, not because he supported abortion.

During the 2018 election campaign, McAdams described himself as pro-life, referring to his "deeply held beliefs about the sanctity of life", and said that Mia Love's charge that he is an abortion advocate was "offensive". McAdams also said "decisions about terminating a pregnancy should [be] made by a woman in consultation with her physician, family members, and faith counselors she trusts".

During the 2026 election campaign, McAdams has pledged support for abortion rights, referring to them as "health care", and saying he would vote to "codify Roe and restore a woman's right to choose" if elected.

=== Economic issues ===
McAdams opposed the Tax Cuts and Jobs Act of 2017 because of the expected $1.5 trillion increase of the national debt over 10 years. He also said it favors the "wealthy over the middle class". He has stated he believes in tax code modernization, but that he considered the tax reform bill "fiscally irresponsible", and believes that its cost "is borrowed from future generations".

McAdams supported measures to reduce the federal deficit, including a balanced budget amendment to the U.S. Constitution.

In 2019, McAdams voted against a House bill to increase the federal minimum wage to $15 per hour. He said he supported a higher minimum wage, but wanted a system that sets the rate based on the regional cost of living and purchasing power. Ahead of the 2026 election, during a forum for young voters, McAdams pledged to support a minimum wage increase.

McAdams was one of 18 Democrats who opposed a $2.2 trillion COVID-19 relief stimulus bill sponsored by Democrats. McAdams said the bill was "a step in the right direction [for economic relief from COVID] but [was] still weighted down with partisan wish list items unrelated to the COVID crisis".

=== Energy and environment ===
McAdams supports efforts to improve Utah's air quality. He requested that the House Transportation and Infrastructure Committee double the funding available for the Utah Transit Authority to purchase electric buses, in an effort to improve air quality. Together with Representative John Curtis, McAdams introduced legislation that would make projects like FrontRunner eligible for federal funding.

McAdams voted for a bill to block the Trump administration from leaving the Paris Agreement. He was the only member of the Utah congressional delegation to do so. In August 2019, McAdams called climate change "the greatest challenge of our time", calling for bipartisan efforts to address it and for Utah to be a leader in those efforts. On the other hand, McAdams did not support the Green New Deal in 2019; he said he would have preferred "government working hand-in-hand with the private sector" to harness "the creativity and entrepreneurship of the private sector... to solve [the] crisis" of climate change. McAdams believes in "the threat of climate change", which he says is "real... and we are seeing it... in Utah".

=== Gun policy ===
In 2019, McAdams said that he supports the Second Amendment but believes in more responsible gun ownership laws.

In February 2019, McAdams voted for a bill requiring background checks for all gun buyers. All of Utah's other representatives voted against it. At the same time, he voted for a Republican-backed amendment requiring Immigration and Customs Enforcement to be notified when an illegal immigrant attempts to buy a firearm and is caught during the background check.

=== Healthcare ===
While serving as Salt Lake County mayor, McAdams called for Congress to make fixes to the Affordable Care Act (Obamacare) instead of repealing it. He had previously called on Congress to renew the Children's Health Insurance Program (CHIP) after its funding lapsed in September 2017. McAdams did not support a "Medicare-for-all" type plan in 2019, because he said it would not "work for [his] constituents".

=== Immigration ===
McAdams has called for comprehensive immigration reform that includes secured borders, increased legal immigration, and a permanent solution for participants in the Deferred Action for Childhood Arrivals (DACA) program, also known as Dreamers. He also supports the principles in the Utah Compact.

During the 2018 election campaign, McAdams opposed President Trump's plans to build a wall on the southern U.S. border with Mexico. During the 2018–19 government shutdown, McAdams said he could accept additional border protection funding, potentially including a wall, if it were part of a compromise bill that included immigration reform and "a fix for the Dreamers and DACA". The government shutdown centered on Trump's demands for additional funds to construct a wall and the unwillingness of House Democrats to agree to it.

McAdams pushed back against a Trump administration plan to rescind visas for immediate family members of H-1B legal immigrants. H-1B visa holders are skilled workers who immigrate with company sponsorship. H-4 visas, which the plan would affect, are issued to their spouses and children under 21.

=== LGBTQ rights ===
McAdams supports same-sex marriage. After the U.S. Supreme Court ruled in Obergefell v. Hodges that same-sex couples have the right to marry, McAdams stated: "As Justice Kennedy stated in his opinion, 'The right of same-sex couples to marry is derived from the Fourteenth Amendment's guarantee of equal protection.' This decision enshrines what I've long believed—that all families should be treated equally under the law".

In 2019, McAdams voted for the Equality Act, which would legally prohibit discrimination on the basis of sexual orientation and gender identity in employment, housing, public accommodations, public education, federal funding, credit, and the jury system. Despite his vote, McAdams has stated he "do[es]n't think it's perfect" and supports continued dialogue and refinement of the bill.

=== Trump administrations ===
==== First Trump administration ====
After the whistleblower complaint in the Trump–Ukraine scandal was released to the public, McAdams expressed support for an impeachment inquiry. He said an inquiry was necessary because Trump had "refus[ed] to further cooperate with congressional oversight, without an impeachment inquiry". On December 18, 2019, McAdams voted for both articles of impeachment against Trump. Two days earlier, he had announced his intention to vote for impeachment, saying, "for me, the evidence is clear" that Trump attempted to undermine the 2020 presidential election by soliciting aid from Ukraine to help his own reelection efforts.

==== Second Trump administration ====
In announcing his 2026 campaign, McAdams accused Trump of "trampling" on "democracy and our Constitution", and faulted the administration for failing to handle problems with inflation and affordability.

== Personal life ==
McAdams is one of six children. He is a member of the Church of Jesus Christ of Latter-day Saints (LDS Church), and served a mission to Brazil in the mid-1990s. McAdams and his wife, Julie, have four children.

During the COVID-19 pandemic, McAdams announced he had tested positive for COVID-19 on March 18, 2020. He was the second sitting member of Congress to test positive, after Mario Díaz-Balart earlier that day. On March 22, McAdams announced that he had been hospitalized since March 20 due to a "severe shortness of breath" related to COVID-19. He was released from the hospital on March 28.

== Electoral history ==
2026 Utah's 1st congressional district election
Party	Candidate	Votes	%	±%
Democratic	Ben McAdams	165,422	70.31%	
Republican	Riley Owen	61,230	26.02%	
Libertarian	Jesse West	5,227	2.22%	
Unaffiliated	Elias H. Montgomery	3,330	1.42%	
Write-in		71	0.03%	
Total votes				
Democratic win (new seat)				

Utah’s 1st congressional district Democratic primary results, 2026
Party	Candidate	Votes	%
Democratic	Ben McAdams	29,737	51.9
Democratic	Nate Blouin	15,771	27.5
Democratic	Liban Mohamed	9,542	16.7
Democratic	Michael Farrell	2,245	3.9
Total votes		57,295	100.0

Utah's 4th congressional district, 2020
Party	Candidate	Votes	%
Republican	Burgess Owens	179,688	47.70%
Democratic	Ben McAdams (incumbent)	175,923	46.70%
Libertarian	John Molnar	13,053	3.46%
United Utah	Jonia Broderick	8,037	2.13%
Write-in		29	0.01%
Total votes		376,730	100.00%
Republican gain from Democratic			

Utah's 4th congressional district, 2018
Party	Candidate	Votes	%
Democratic	Ben McAdams	134,964	50.1
Republican	Mia Love (incumbent)	134,277	49.9
Independent	Jonathan Larele Peterson (write-in)	37	0.0
Total votes		269,271	100.0
Democratic gain from Republican			

2016 Salt Lake County mayoral general election results
Party	Candidate	Votes	%	±%
Democratic	Ben McAdams (incumbent)	238,927	59.36%	+4.89%
Republican	David Robinson	163,558	40.64%	−4.78%
Total votes		402,485	100%	+7.91%

2012 Salt Lake County mayoral general election results
Party	Candidate	Votes	%	±%
Democratic	Ben McAdams	203,170	54.47%	−11.31%
Republican	Mark Crockett	169,418	45.42%	+13.3%
Write-ins		389	0.10%	+0.04%
Total votes		372,977	100%	+4.77%

== See also ==
- Politics of Utah
- List of United States representatives from Utah
- United States House of Representatives

Political offices
Preceded by Peter Corroon	Mayor of Salt Lake County; 2013–2019	Succeeded by Jenny Wilson
U.S. House of Representatives
Preceded by Mia Love	Member of the U.S. House of Representatives from Utah's 4th congressional district 2019–2021	Succeeded by Burgess Owens
Preceded by Blake Moore; Redistricted	Member of the U.S. House of Representatives from Utah's 1st congressional district Taking office 2027	Elect
U.S. order of precedence (ceremonial)
Preceded by Enid Greene as Former U.S. Representative	Order of precedence of the United States as Former U.S. Representative	Succeeded by Kendra Horn as Former U.S. Representative
