= Senator Carlin =

Senator Carlin may refer to:

- David Carlin (born 1938), Rhode Island State Senate
- Thomas Carlin (1789–1852), Illinois State Senate

== See also ==
- Richard J. Carling (born 1937), Utah State Senate
