= Senator Blouin =

Senator Blouin may refer to:

- Mike Blouin (born 1945), Iowa State Senate
- Nate Blouin (born 1989), Utah State Senate
- Sara Gelser Blouin (born 1973), Oregon State Senate
