= Utah's 29th State Senate district =

American legislative district

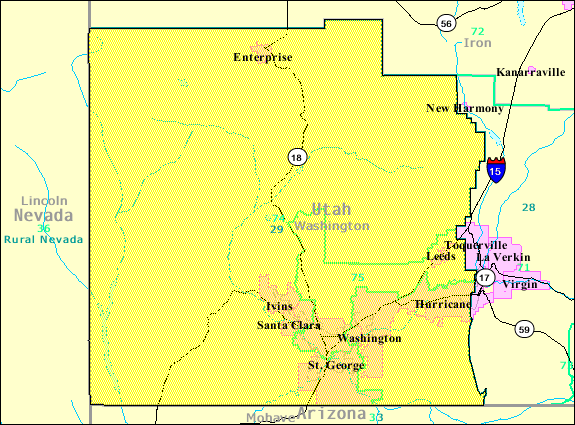
Map of the 29th Utah Senate District.

The 29th Utah Senate District is located in Washington County and includes Utah House Districts 71, 74, and 75. The current State Senator representing the 29th district is Don L. Ipson. Ipson was appointed to replace Steve Urquhart in the Utah State Senate in 2016.

== Previous Utah State Senators (District 29) ==
Name	Party	Term
Stephen H. Urquhart	Republican	2009–2016
John W. (Bill) Hickman	Republican	2001–2009
Lorin V. Jones	Republican	1997–2001
David L. Watson	Republican	1993–1997
Dixie L. Leavitt	Republican	1989–1992
Ivan M. Matheson	Republican	1977–1988

== Election results ==
=== 2004 General Election ===
Utah State Senate election, 2004
Party	Candidate	Votes	%	±%
Republican	John W. Hickman	23,980	63.7	
Democratic	Dixie H. Andrus	12,405	33.0	
Constitution	Philip Jensen	659	1.8	
Libertarian	Dave Starr Seely	574	1.5	

Utah State Senate Election, 2022
Party	Candidate	Votes	%	±%
Republican	Bridger Bolinder	10,832	71.2%	
Constitution	Kirk Pearson	2,254	14.8%	
Democratic	Chris Dyer	2,131	14.0%	

== See also ==
- John W. Hickman
- Utah Democratic Party
- Utah Republican Party
- Utah Senate
