= Senator Hickman =

Senator Hickman may refer to:

- Billy Hickman (born 1952), Georgia State Senate
- Craig Hickman (born 1967), Maine State Senate
- John W. Hickman (Utah politician) (born 1939), Utah State Senate
- Richard Hickman (1757–1832), Kentucky State Senate
- Rod Hickman (born 1988/89), Mississippi State Senate
