= Gene Davis (politician) =

American politician (born 1945)

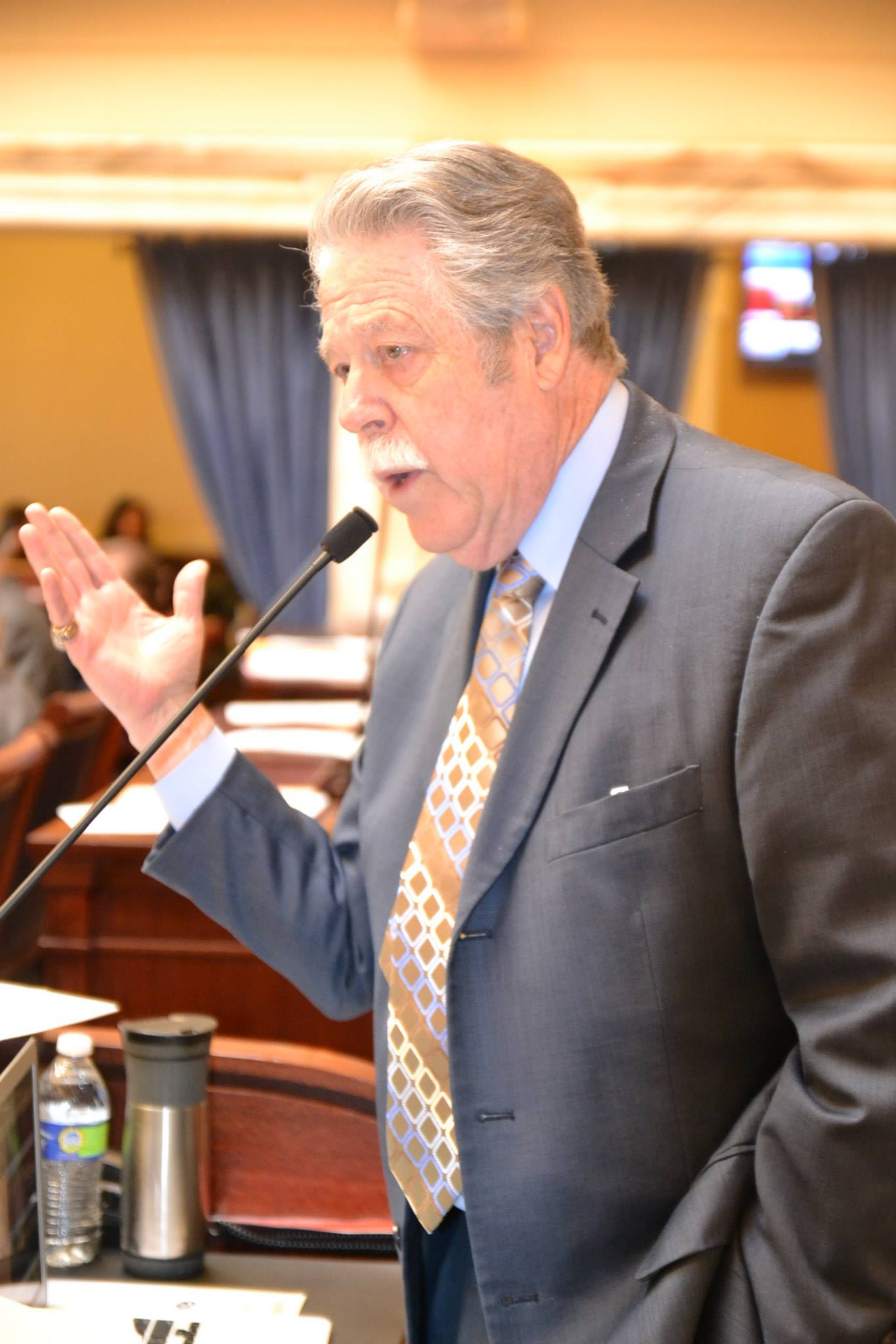
- Davis in July 2014

Minority Leader of the Utah Senate
- In office January 28, 2013 – January 28, 2019
- Preceded by: Ross I. Romero
- Succeeded by: Karen Mayne

Member of the Utah Senate from the 3rd district
- In office January 1, 1999 – December 31, 2022
- Preceded by: Blaze Wharton
- Succeeded by: Nate Blouin (Redistricting)

Member of the Utah House of Representatives from the 30th district
- In office January 1, 1987 – December 31, 1998
- Preceded by: ???
- Succeeded by: Jackie Biskupski

Personal details
- Born: July 2, 1945 (age 81) Salt Lake City, Utah, U.S.
- Party: Democratic
- Spouse: Penny
- Education: La Salle Extension University (BA, LLB)

Gene Davis (born July 2, 1945) is a former Democratic member of the Utah Senate, representing the 3rd District from 1999 to 2022. He previously served in the Utah House of Representatives from 1987 to 1998.

== Personal life, education, and career ==
Davis graduated from South High School. He then received his Bachelor of Laws from LaSalle Extension University and his Radio Operational Engineering (Electrical Engineering) degree. He worked in public relations and advertising. Davis went to high school where he meet his future wife Penny. They wedded in 1971 and were married for 45 years before Penny's passing in 2015. They have two children and six grandchildren.

In 2021, Davis was accused of sexual harassment by a Utah Capitol staffer.

== Political career ==
Davis has served on the Sugarhouse Community Council as the past chair. He is also the past president for the Sugarhouse Rotary. Davis served in the House of Representatives from January 1, 1987 - December 31, 1998. He was elected to the Senate in 1998. In 2012, Senator Davis was elected as the Minority Leader in the senate.

In 2016, Senator Davis served on the following committees:

- Business, Economic Development, and Labor Appropriations Subcommittee
- Executive Appropriations Committee
- Retirement and Independent Entities Appropriations Subcommittee
- Senate Business and Labor Committee
- Senate Ethics Committee (Vice Chair)
- Senate Retirement and Independent Entities Committee
- Senate Revenue and Taxation Committee
- Senate Judiciary, Law Enforcement, and Criminal Justice Committee

=== Electoral history ===
In 2022, Davis lost to Democratic candidate Nate Blouin in the primary election.

2018 Utah State Senate election District 3
Party	Candidate	Votes	%	±%
Republican				
Democratic	Gene Davis			

In 2014 Davis ran unopposed in the primary and general election.

2010 Utah State Senate election District 3
Party	Candidate	Votes	%	±%
Republican	Lee Brinton	9,190	49%	
Democratic	Gene Davis	9,396	51%	

2006 Utah State Senate election District 3
Party	Candidate	Votes	%	±%
Republican	Julene Oliver	7,032	42.7	
Democratic	Gene Davis	8,983	54.5	

2002 Utah State Senate election District 3
Party	Candidate	Votes	%	±%
Republican	Brad Probst	8,512	48.2	
Democratic	Gene Davis	9,146	51.8	

== Legislation ==
=== 2016 sponsored bills ===
Bill Title and Number	Bill Status
S.B.77 Medicaid Expansion Proposal	Senate/Filed for bills not passed 3/10/2016
S.B. 247 Sale of State Land Act	Senate/Filed for bills not passed 3/10/2016
S.B. 253 Animal Shelter Revisions	Senate/Filed for bills not passed 3/10/2016
S.J.R. 7 Joint Rules Resolution On Committee Bills	Senate/Filed for bills not passed 3/10/2016

=== Notable legislation ===
In 2016 Senator Davis sponsored the bill SB77, which would have created full medicaid expansion for the state under the Affordable Care Act. The bill did not pass, instead Representative Dunnigan's health care bill HB437 passed.

Utah State Senate
Preceded by Ross I. Romero	Minority Leader of the Utah Senate; 2013–2019	Succeeded by Karen Mayne
