= Silvia Catten =

American politician

Member-elect of the Utah State Senate from the 13th district
- Assuming office January 2027
- Succeeding: Nate Blouin

Personal details
- Party: Democratic

Silvia Catten is an American politician. A member of the Democratic Party, she is the member-elect for the 13th district of the Utah State Senate.
