= Walt Brooks =

American politician (born 1973)

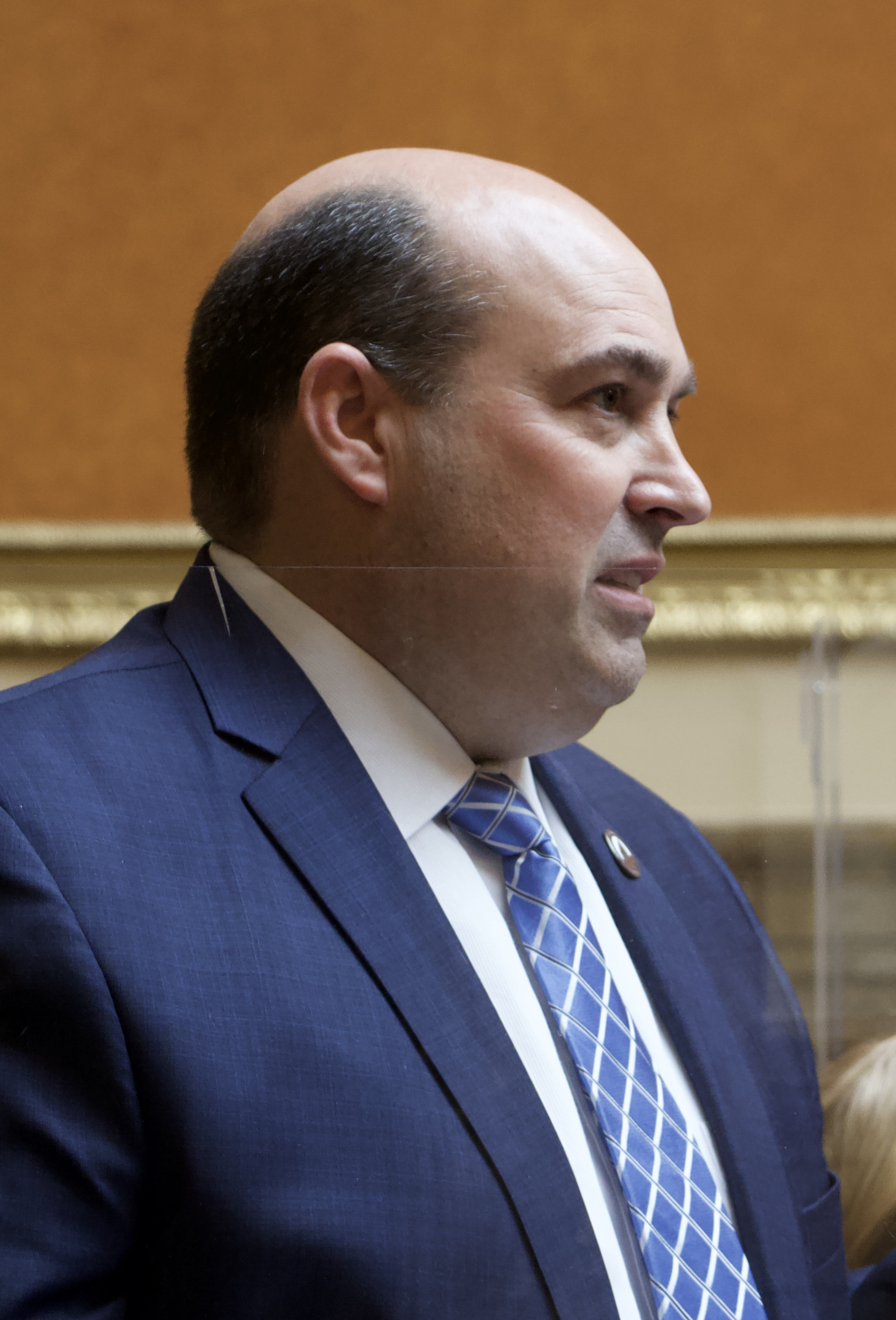

Member of the Utah House of Representatives from the 75th district
- Incumbent
- Assumed office September 21, 2016
- Preceded by: Don Ipson

Personal details
- Born: January 21, 1973 (age 53) St. George, Utah
- Party: Republican
- Spouse: Jennifer Brooks
- Education: Southern Utah University

Walt Brooks (born January 21, 1973) is an American politician who has served in the Utah House of Representatives from the 75th district since 2016. He was appointed in September 2016 to replace Representative Don Ipson, who himself was appointed to the senate to replace Senator Steve Urquhart.

During the 2022 General Session, Brooks served on the Infrastructure and General Government Appropriations Subcommittee; House Business and Labor Committee; House Government Operations Committee; and House Rules Committee.

== Personal life and career ==
Walt Brooks is from St. George, living with his wife and five children in the home his great grandfather built. His family is influential in the community, with his grandfather the namesake of the local Dixie High School football stadium (Walt Brooks Stadium). He is the president of RxTrax, a software company dealing with pharmaceutical delivery services tracking.

== Notable legislation ==
- 2022- Representative Brooks ran HB60, Vaccine Passport Amendments, which would make it unlawful for a place of public accommodation to discriminate against an individual based on the individual's immunity status. The bill was heard in the House Business and Labor Committee, ultimately receiving a favorable recommendation to move to the House floor despite several nay votes from committee members. Due to the large number of public attendees, the committee meeting required multiple overflow rooms and became one of the most heavily debated and scrutinized bill of the 2022 General Session. The bill passed the House floor with a vote of 51-23-1, and then passed the Senate Revenue and Taxation Committee and Senate floor, but ultimately the bill did not make it to final passage.
- 2021- Brooks successfully ran HB60 which allows for a form of "Constitutional Carry" of a concealed firearm without a permit for adults over the age of 21 (Utah also allows adults 18-21 to carry concealed with a provisional permit, but they were not included in this legislation.)
- 2021- Brooks, who attended Dixie High School and Dixie College, was vehemently opposed to the efforts to change the name of his alma mater. Then called Dixie State University(now Utah Tech University,) He resisted the bill during the 2021 session, but the name change ultimately happened.
- 2018- HB 343 Refined some terms related to Polygamy. The bill expanded the definition of sexual abuse to include forcing someone into marriage (rather legal or cultural), and similarly changed policy about the rights of runaway children (who claim they are subject to forced marriage, or other forms of abuse.) Brooks' district is nearby Hildale, Utah where the FLDS Church has many members who practice polygamy, and the issues this bill concerns is more common.

== 2022 sponsored legislation ==
Bill	Status
HB 10- Lane Filtering Amendments	House/ to Governor 3/14/22
HB 53- Social Security Tax Amendments	House/ filed 3/4/22
HB 60- Vaccine Passport Amendments	House/ filed 3/4/22
HB 108- Vehicle Inspection Amendments	House/ to Governor 3/10/22
HB 254- Utah State Railroad Museum Authority Amendments	House/ to Governor 3/10/22
HJR 8- Joint Resolution Promoting Awareness of Motorcycling	House/ filed 3/4/2022
