= Karianne Lisonbee =

American politician

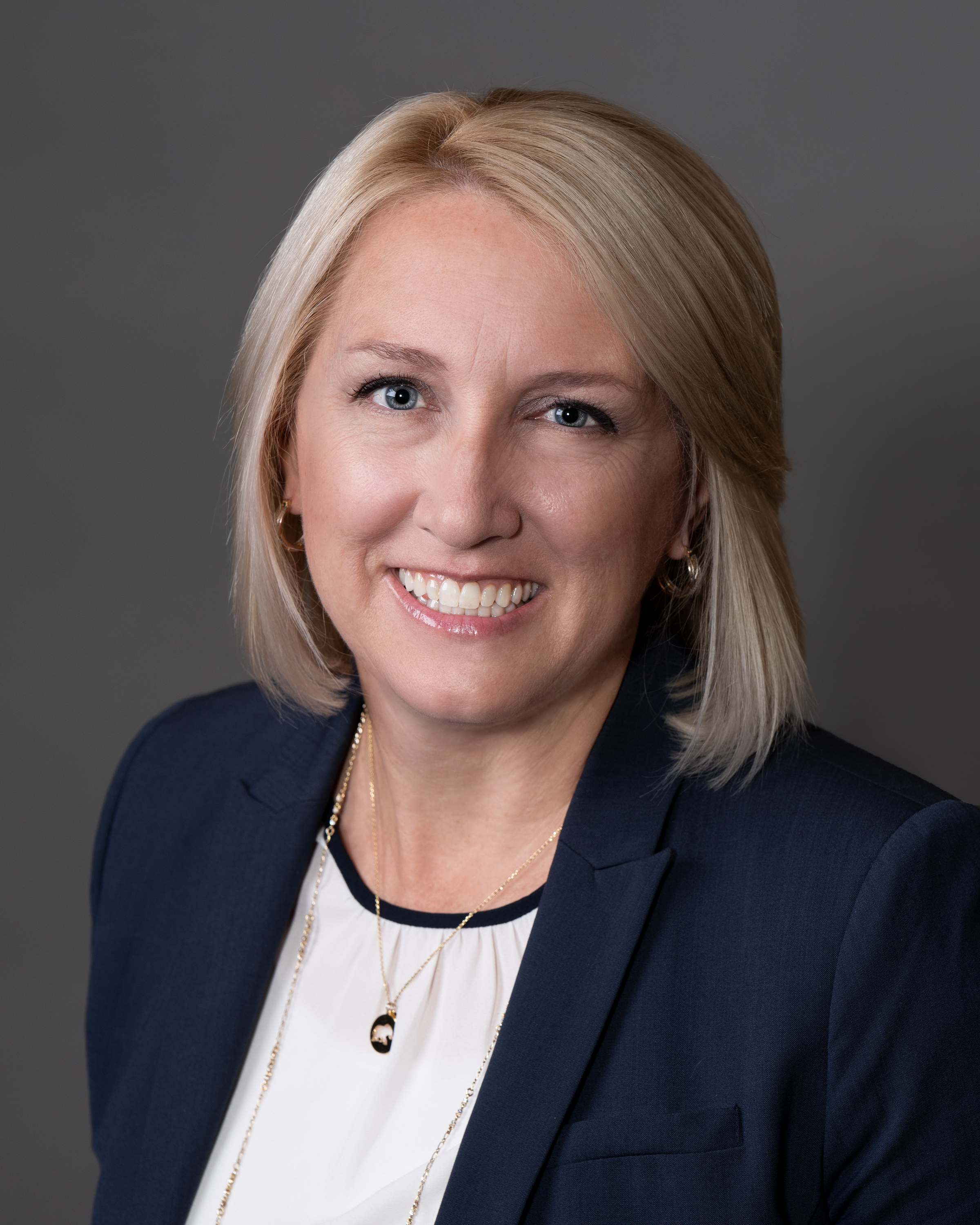

Member of the Utah House of Representatives from the 14th district
- Incumbent
- Assumed office January 1, 2017
- Preceded by: Curtis Oda

Personal details
- Born: Nebraska, U.S.
- Party: Republican
- Children: 6
- Education: Brigham Young University (BA)

Karianne Lisonbee is an American politician serving as a member of the Utah House of Representatives from the 14th district. She was first elected in 2016.

== Career ==
Prior to her election to the Utah legislature, Lisonbee was serving her second term on the Syracuse City Council.

Lisonbee was elected to House Leadership as Assistant Majority Whip in November 2022.

Lisonbee was a candidate for the Republican nomination for Utah's 2nd congressional district in 2026, running against Blake Moore. Although Lisonbee won the caucus nomination, Moore qualified for the primary election by collecting signatures. Moore won the primary with 56.7% of the vote.
