= Utah's 3rd State Senate district =

American legislative district

The 3rd Utah Senate District is located in Salt Lake County and includes Utah House Districts 31, 33, 35, 37, 40, 43, 44 and 47. The current State Senator representing the 3rd district is Gene Davis. Davis was first elected to the Utah Senate in 1998, and won his most recent re-election in 2018 with 70% of the vote.

== Previous Utah State Senators (District 3) ==
| Name | Party | Term |
|---|---|---|
| Blaze D. Wharton | Democratic | 1993–1998 |
| Robert C. Steiner | Democratic | 1991–1992 |
| Richard J. Carling | Republican | 1975–1990 |
| Allan E. Mecham | Republican | 1974 |
| Richard J. Carling | Republican | 1973 |
| Allen E. Mecham | Republican | 1972 |
| Welch, Charles | Republican | 1967–1971 |
| John A. Lambert | Democratic | 1963–1965 |
| Alonzo F. Hopkin | Democratic | 1935–1961 |
| Paul H. Hunt | Republican | 1931–1933 |
| H. Fred Egan | | 1927–1929 |
| G. Frank Ryan | | 1923–1925 |
| Rufus Adams | Republican | 1921 |
| Richard Stringham | | 1917–1919 |
| John W. Thornley | | 1913–1915 |
| Christopher Burton | | 1909–1911 |
| Wesley K. Walton | | 1905–1907 |
| J.G.M Barnes | Democratic | 1901–1903 |
| Aquila Nebeker | | 1897–1899 |
| John R. Barnes | Democratic | 1896 |

== Election results ==
=== 2006 General Election ===
Utah State Senate election, 2006
| Party | Candidate | Votes | % | ±% |
|---|---|---|---|---|
| Democratic | Gene Davis | 8,983 | 54.6 | |
| Republican | Julene B. Oliver | 7,032 | 42.7 | |
| Constitution | Brian Mecham | 444 | 2.7 | |

== See also ==
- Gene Davis
- Utah Democratic Party
- Utah Republican Party
- Utah Senate

| Preceded by Blaze D. Wharton | Gene Davis; 1999 - Present | Succeeded by Incumbent |
