= Steven J. Lund (politician) =

American politician

Member of the Utah House of Representatives
- In office January 1, 2021 – December 31, 2024
- Preceded by: Derrin Owens
- Succeeded by: Troy Shelley
- Constituency: 58th district (2021–2023); 66th district (2023–2024)

Personal details
- Born: Mount Pleasant, Utah
- Party: Republican

Steven J. Lund is an engineer and American politician who served as a member of the Utah House of Representatives from the 66th district. He is a member of the Republican Party.

== Early life and education ==
Lund attended and graduated from Manti High School and received he BS Degree in Petroleum Engineering from the New Mexico Institute of Mining and Technology.

== Political career ==
Prior to his service in the Utah State legislature, Lund served as a Sanpete County Commissioner. In 2020, Lund ran for State Representative and won with 84.6% of the vote. He is currently running for his second consecutive term.

In the 2022 legislative session, Lund served on the Business, Economic Development, and Labor Appropriations Subcommittee, House Economic Development and Workforce Services Committee, and the House Public Utilities, Energy, and Technology Committee.

== 2022 sponsored legislation ==
Bill Number	Bill Title	Status
HB0235	Speed Limit Designation Amendments	Governor signed - 3/15/2022
HB0378	Mining Operations Amendments	Governor signed - 3/21/2022
