= Parents for Choice in Education =

Advocacy group

- Formation: 2002
- Headquarters: Salt Lake City, Utah

Parents for Choice in Education (PCE) is an advocacy group headquartered in Salt Lake City, Utah, that pushes for school choice programs, including private school vouchers, and supports anti-union legislation.

== Organization ==
PCE, headquartered in Salt Lake City, Utah, operates three organizations: Parents for Choice in Education Foundation, a 501(c)(3) nonprofit organization; Parents for Choice in Education, Inc., a 501(c)(4) nonprofit organization; and a state political action committee or PAC.

== History ==
PCE was founded in 2002 as the "Utah Education Funding Project" with money from "All Children Matter", an anti-union, pro-voucher group based in Michigan. According to a KSL report, ACM's "funders include the son of a former Amway billionaire and an heir to the Wal-mart fortune." Out-of-state funding continues to be important to PCE. In 2007, KSL reported that the "political action committee for Parents for Choice in Education took in half a million dollars last year; half came from out-of-state, $240,000 from All Children Matter."

PCE played a large role in the passage of Utah's Carson Smith Special Needs Scholarship, a state funded program that provides private school scholarships to K–12 students with disabilities, as well as the nation's first statewide, universal voucher program, which was later overturned through a statewide referendum.

PCE's 2007, voucher fight was funded almost entirely by one man, Patrick M. Byrne, the founder and CEO of Overstock.com. Some of PCE's tactics during this campaign were criticized as "despicable" by critics including Wayne Holland, chair of the Utah Democratic Party. Among the tactics criticized was a push-poll which asked, "If you knew that the same group that opposes vouchers, the liberal national teacher's [sic] union, aggressively supports same-sex unions, higher taxes and more government involvement, would you be very or somewhat more or less likely to vote for or against the Utah referendum?"

PCE continues to lobby in Utah. In the 2008, General Session of the Utah State Legislature, PCE supported House Bill 349, Open Enrollment Revisions, which lengthened the enrollment period for special permits in public schools. In 2009, PCE opposed a cap on charter schools.

PCE has supported anti-union bills even when they don't address school choice. In 2009, PCE initiated House Bill 328, which would have banned school districts from paying the salaries of union employees, and House Bill 210, which requires schools to post their collective bargaining agreements online. In the 2010 General Session, PCE backed SB77, which would have prohibited school districts from paying for association leave. This bill failed in the Utah House of Representatives.

PCE's website formerly called itself "UtahEducationFacts.com."
