= Loveland Living Planet Aquarium =

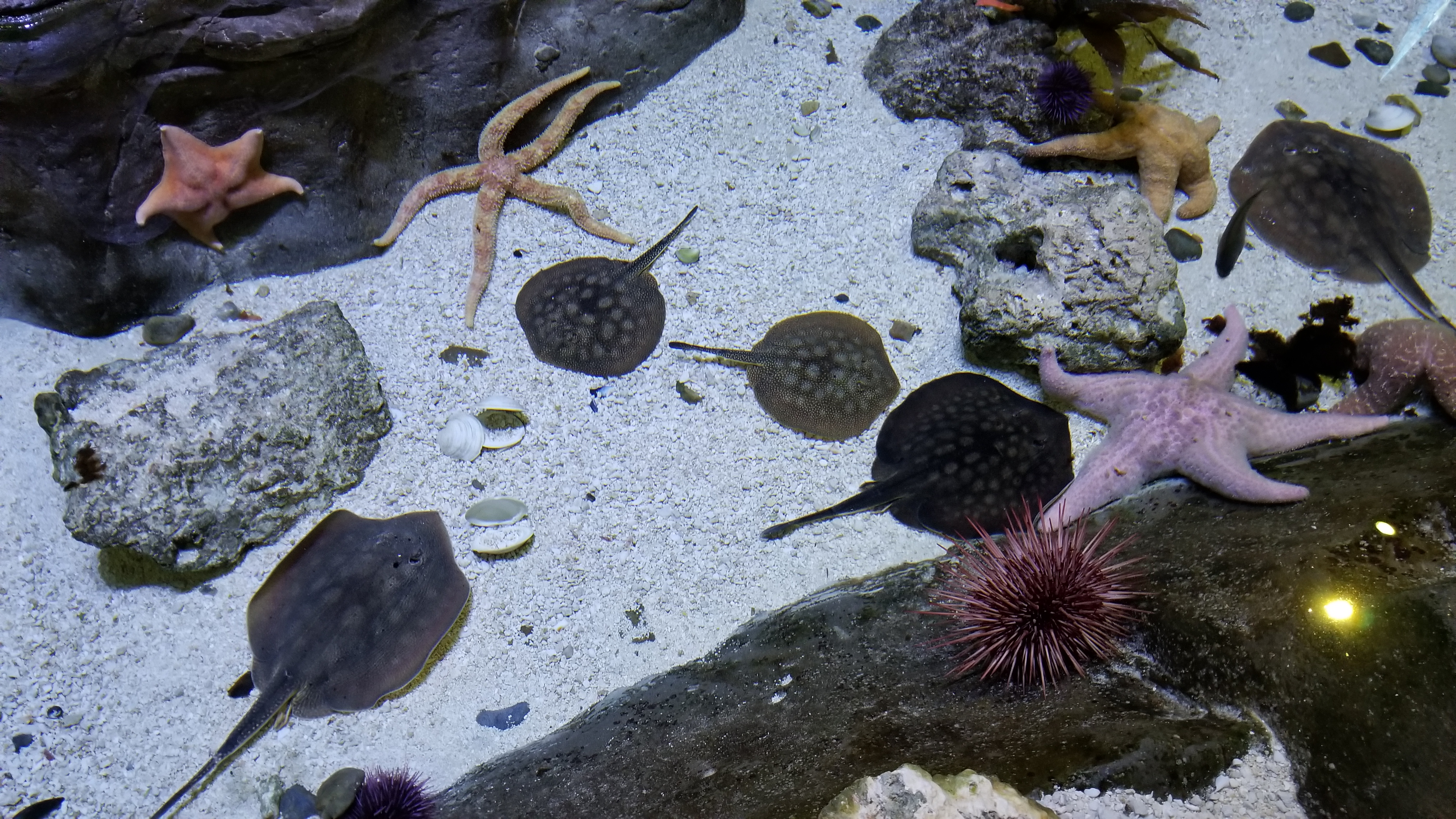
- Touch pool located at the aquarium.
- Interactive map of Loveland Living Planet Aquarium
- 40°31′56″N 111°53′38″W
- Date opened: February 28, 1999
- Location: Draper, Utah, United States
- Floor space: 136,000 sq ft (12,600 m^{2})
- No. of animals: 2,484
- No. of species: 450+
- Volume of largest tank: 300,000 US gallons (1,100,000 L)
- Total volume of tanks: 600,000 US gallons (2,271,000 L)
- Annual visitors: 1 million +
- Memberships: 30,000
- Major exhibits: 74
- Website: livingplanetaquarium.org

The Loveland Living Planet Aquarium is a public aquarium located in Draper, Utah, United States. It houses 4,500 animals representing 550 species, and it consists of five main exhibits.

== History ==
The Loveland Living Planet Aquarium was founded in 1997 by Brent Andersen, a Utah native and marine biology graduate from the University of California Santa Barbara.

== Exhibits ==
=== Ocean Explorer ===
The Ocean Explorer features saltwater species from all over the world, including jellyfish, moray eels, octopus, seahorses, sea turtles, wolf eels, clownfish, lionfish, stingrays, and nine species of shark. Shark species include swellsharks, horn sharks, coral catsharks, epaulette sharks, nurse sharks, zebra sharks, sandbar sharks, blacktip reef sharks, and grey reef sharks. The shark tunnel weighs 26,000 pounds and was lifted through the roof of the aquarium with a crane. The tunnel is made from 3.5 inch thick acrylic.

=== Antarctic Adventure ===
Antarctic Adventure immerses guests in a Falkland Islands research station where they meet gentoo penguins. As of early April 2025, macaroni penguins were also added to the habitat.

=== Journey to South America ===
The Journey to South America is made to look like a rainforest, and houses animals such as a 14-foot yellow anaconda, piranhas, caiman, corydoras, tarantulas, tree boas, electric eels, and poison dart frogs. The exhibit is meant to educate guests about the biodiversity of rainforest ecosystems, the benefits rainforests provide, and how to help protect rainforest habitats.

=== Discover Utah ===
The Discover Utah was added during a big renovation on October 24, 2013, and contains Bonneville Cutthroat Trout, Desert tortoises, and North American River Otters. The exhibit has a focus on the local wildlife (as the name suggests) and is presented by the Central Utah Water Conservancy District.

=== Expedition: Asia ===
Expedition: Asia originally opened as a travelling exhibit on June 15, 2016, featuring various species from Southeast Asia. In 2026, Expedition: Asia had since been renovated to the newest permanent exhibit at the aquarium, featuring a new playground as well as species such as clouded leopards, binturongs, a monkey skink, a black tree monitor, Asian small-clawed otters, Raja the Komodo dragon, a coconut crab, and numerous other animals from Indonesia and New Guinea.

=== Rio Tinto Kennecott Plaza ===
The Rio Tinto Kennecott Plaza was added to the Loveland Living Planet Aquarium in 2020. It features the signature VR claw, two playgrounds, and even outdoor habitats for various fish species.

== Community outreach ==
The aquarium's education department currently operates two outreach programs: the Utah Waters Van and the Rainforest Van.
