= John W. Hickman (Utah politician) =

American politician (born 1939)

Member of the Utah Senate from the 29th district
- In office 2001–2009
- Succeeded by: Stephen H. Urquhart

Personal details
- Born: June 2, 1939 (age 87)
- Party: Republican
- Spouse: DyAnn
- Occupation: Banker

John W. Hickman (born June 2, 1939) is an American politician from Utah. A Republican, he was a member of the Utah State Senate, representing the state's 29th senate district in St. George from 2001 until 2009.

== Early life and career ==
Hickman holds a bachelor's degree from Southern Utah University.

Hickman served in the Utah House of Representatives for house district 75 from 1993 to 2001. He was elected to the Utah Senate from senate district 29 (Washington County) in 2001. He was re-elected in 2004 with 64% of the vote. He announced at the conclusion of the 2008 legislative session that he would not be seeking re-election in November. Rep. Steve Urquhart won the general election to take his place.
