= Nate Blouin =

American politician in Utah

Member of the Utah State Senate from the 13th district
- Incumbent
- Assumed office January 1, 2023
- Preceded by: Gene Davis (redistricted)
- Succeeded by: Silvia Catten (elect)

Personal details
- Born: Nathan Allen Blouin; May 16, 1989 (age 37) Concord, New Hampshire, U.S.
- Party: Democratic
- Spouse: Jacqueline Rosen (m. 2019)
- Education: Salt Lake Community College (attended); University of Utah (BA); Brown University (MPA)

Nathan Allen Blouin (born May 16, 1989) is an American politician and climate policy advocate who represents Utah's 13th Senate District in the Utah State Senate. A progressive Democrat, Blouin ran for the Democratic nomination in Utah's 1st congressional district in the 2026 U.S. House elections.

== Education and early career ==
Blouin received his associate's degree from Salt Lake Community College and his bachelor's degree from the University of Utah. He graduated from Brown University with a Master of Public Administration. Before being elected, Blouin worked with clean energy groups and environmental organizations to promote renewable energy.

He married Jacqueline Rosen in 2019.

== Political career ==
Blouin announced his candidacy for the Utah State Senate in 2022; his priorities included clean air and affordable housing. He won the Democratic primary against incumbent Gene Davis with nearly 76% of the vote. In the general election, he beat Republican Roger L. Stout with 72% of the vote.

In 2026, Blouin lost his bid for the Democratic nomination in Utah's 1st congressional district in the U.S. House elections. Blouin received the second-most votes at 28 percent.

Following his congressional defeat, Blouin joined the Democratic Socialists of America.

== Election history ==
=== 2022 ===
General election for Utah State Senate District 13
Party	Candidate	Votes	%
Democratic	Nate Blouin	22,311	71.8%
Republican	Roger Stout	8,781	28.2%
Total votes		31,092	100%

Democratic primary for Utah State Senate District 13
Party	Candidate	Votes	%
Democratic	Nate Blouin	4,469	75.9%
Democratic	Gene Davis (incumbent)	1,420	24.1%
Total votes		5,889	100%

=== 2026 ===
Democratic primary for Utah's 1st congressional district
Party	Candidate	Votes	%
Democratic	Ben McAdams	29,569	52.1
Democratic	Nate Blouin	15,603	27.5
Democratic	Liban Mohamed	9,312	16.4
Democratic	Michael Farrell	2,228	3.9
Total votes		56,712	100.0
