= Unaffiliated =

Unaffiliated, meaning a lack of affiliation, may refer to:

- Apoliticism, a lack of any political affiliation
  - Nonpartisanism, a lack of affiliation to a political party
  - Independent politician or unaffiliated politician
  - Independent voter or unaffiliated voter
- Irreligion, a lack of any religious affiliation

== See also ==
- Affiliation (disambiguation)
