= Don Ipson =

American politician

Member of the Utah Senate from the 29th district
- Incumbent
- Assumed office September 21, 2016
- Preceded by: Stephen H. Urquhart

Member of the Utah House of Representatives from the 75th district
- In office January 1, 2009 – September 21, 2016
- Preceded by: Stephen H. Urquhart
- Succeeded by: Walt Brooks

Personal details
- Born: Panguitch, Utah, U.S.
- Party: Republican
- Spouse: JoAnn Ipson
- Education: LDS Business College

Don L. Ipson is an American politician and a Republican, he serves and represents the 29th District of the Utah State Senate. He was previously a member of the Utah House of Representatives representing District 75 from 2009 to 2016. He got re-elected on November 5, 2024 and his term will end on January 1, 2029.

== Personal life and career ==
Ipson attended Panguitch High School and later earned his BA in Accounting and Business Administration from the LDS Business College. Ipson lives in St. George, Utah with his wife. He has four sons and ten grandchildren. He works in transportation, and is the CEO of DATS Trucking Inc.

He participates in many organizations, including the Southern Utah Trucking Association (past president); Utah Trucking Association (past president); Dixie ATC (director and past chair); Utah College of Applied Technology (past chair); UDOT Motor Carrier Advisory Board (chairman); UHP Honorary Colonels (past chair); and the St. George Lions Club.

== Political career ==
- 2008 - When District 75 incumbent Republican Representative Stephen H. Urquhart ran for Utah State Senate and left the seat open, Ipson was selected from among four candidates by the Republican convention and was unopposed for the November 4, 2008 General election, winning with 10,613 votes.
- 2010 - Ipson was unopposed for the June 22, 2010 Republican Primary and won the November 2, 2010 General election with 6,975 votes (83.9%) against Democratic nominee Jerry Howard.
- 2012 - Ipson was unopposed for the June 26, 2012 Republican Primary and won the three-way November 6, 2012 General election with 10,299 votes (78.7%) against Democratic nominee Cimarron Chacon and Constitution candidate Randall Hinton.
- 2014 - Ipson was unopposed for the Republican convention and won in the November 4, 2014 General election with 4,680 votes (65.5%) against Independent American nominee Nihla Judd, and Democratic nominee Cheryl Hawker.
- 2016 - Ipson was appointed to replace Steve Urquhart in the Utah State Senate.

== 2016 sponsored legislation ==
Bill number	Bill name	Bill status
HB0062	Law Enforcement and Criminal Justice - Statutory Reports Repeal	Governor Signed - 3/23/2016
HB0476	Paint Stewardship Act	House/ filed - 3/10/2016

Ipson also floor sponsored SB0036 Postretirement Employment Exceptions, SB0094 Law Enforcement Use of Body Cameras, SB0131S03 Utah College of Applied Technology Governance Amendments, SB0132 Commercial Driver License Amendments, SB0136S02 Division of Occupational and Professional Licensing Amendments, SB0183 Department of Public Safety Amendments, SB0190 Open and Public Meetings Law Revisions, SB019401 Vehicle Registration and Insurance Amendments, and SB0197S01 Resale of Procurement Item Amendments.
