= Richard J. Carling =

American politician (1937–2024)

Member of the Utah Senate from the 3rd district
- In office 1975–1990; 1973

Member of the Utah House of Representatives
- In office 1966–1973

Personal details
- Born: December 6, 1937 Salt Lake City, Utah, U.S.
- Died: April 30, 2024 (aged 86)
- Party: Republican
- Spouse: Diane Saxey Carling
- Profession: Attorney

Richard J. Carling (December 6, 1937 – April 30, 2024) was an American politician who was a Republican member of the Utah House of Representatives and Utah State Senate. An attorney, he attended the University of Utah where he earned a law degree. He was an avid runner and ran in over 155 races, including over 35 Honolulu Marathons and 39 consecutive Boston Marathons. Carling died on April 30, 2024, at the age of 86.
