= Stephen H. Urquhart =

American politician (born 1965)

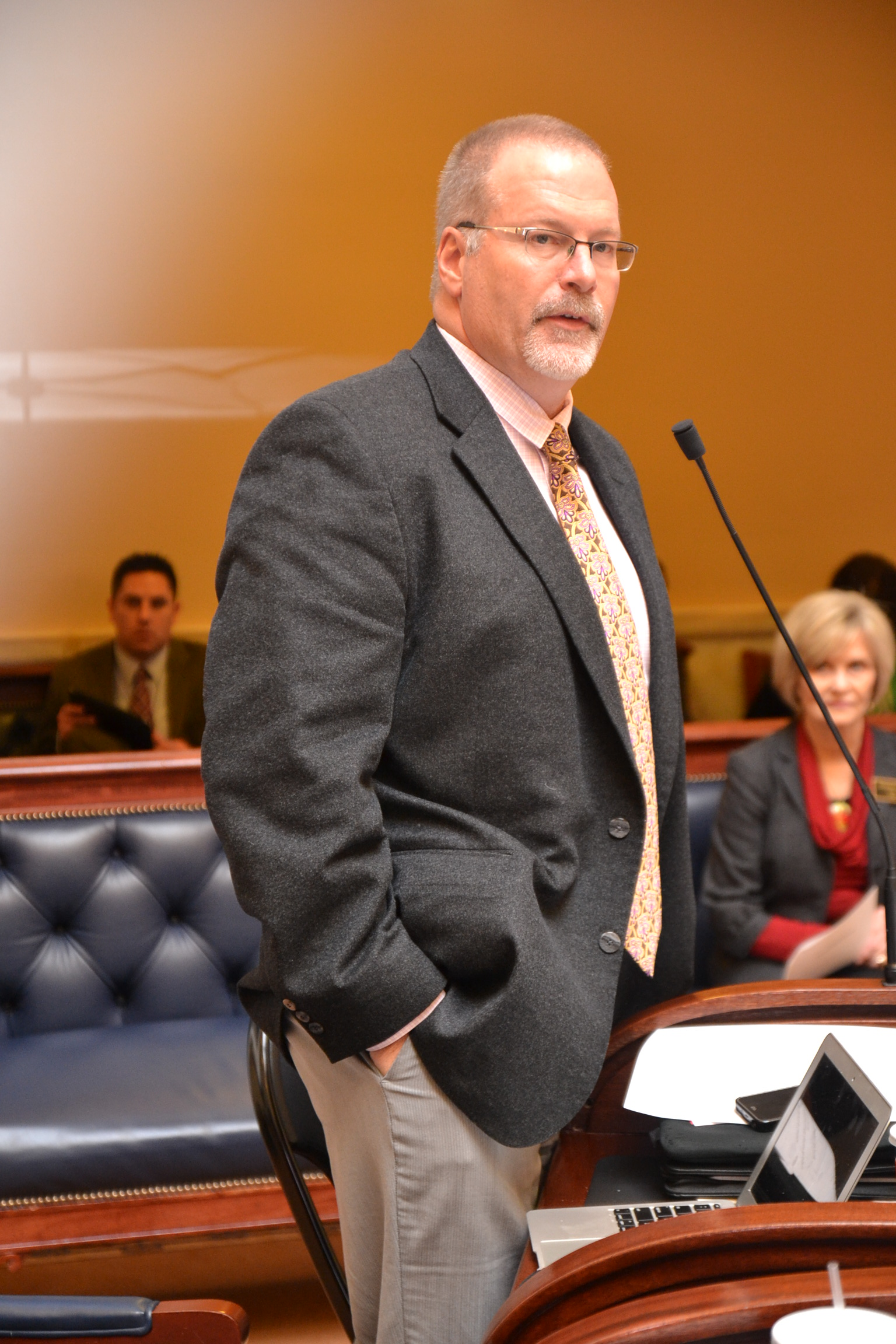
- Urquhart in January 2014

Member of the Utah State Senate from the 29th District
- In office 2009–2016
- Preceded by: John Hickman
- Succeeded by: Don L. Ipson

Member of the Utah House of Representatives from the 75th District
- In office 2001–2009
- Succeeded by: Don L. Ipson

Personal details
- Born: June 20, 1965 (age 61)
- Party: Republican
- Spouse: Sara
- Occupation: Attorney

Stephen Harold Urquhart (born June 20, 1965) is an American politician and religious leader from Utah. A Republican, he was a member of the Utah State Senate, representing the State's 29th Senate district in Washington County from 2009 to 2016, and he served in the Utah House of Representatives from 2001 to 2009.

In 2020 Urquhart formed The Divine Assembly, a new church dedicated to the healing and mind-expanding powers of psilocybin mushrooms.

== Early years ==
Stephen Harold Urquhart was born June 20, 1965. Urquhart received his Juris Doctor from Brigham Young University and his bachelor's degree in Biology from Williams College. He graduated from Spring Branch Senior High School in Houston, Texas in 1983. He is a lawyer by profession.

== Political career ==
Urquhart is an American politician from Utah. A Republican, he was a member of the Utah State Senate, representing the State's 29th Senate district in Washington County 2009-2016. Prior to that, he served in the Utah House of Representatives from 2001 to 2009. He has also served as a board member for the Dixie Regional Medical Center, St. George Art Around the Corner, and St. George Community Center. He was succeeded both in his time in the House, and then his time in the senate by Don Ipson.

In 2016, Senator Urquhart sat on the following committees (and subcommittees) in the Senate:

- Higher Education Appropriations Subcommittee (Chair)
- Public Education Appropriations Subcommittee
- Senate Education Committee
- Senate Rules Committee
- Senate Judiciary, Law Enforcement, and Criminal Justice Committee

He resigned early in September 2016 amongst other career commitments, already having announced his retirement, and was replaced by then Representative Ipson.

== Legislation ==
=== 2016 sponsored bills ===
Bill Number	Bill Title	Bill Status
S.B. 1	Higher Education Base Budget	Governor Signed 2/16/2016
S.B. 39	Medicaid Coverage for Adult Dental Services	Governor Signed 3/25/2016
S.B. 107	Hate Crimes Amendments	Senate/Filed for bills not passed 3/10/2016
S.B. 131	Utah College of Applied Technology Governance Amendments	Governor Signed 3/23/2016
S.B. 146	Workers' Compensation Amendments	Governor Signed 3/17/2016
S.B. 188	Higher Education Capital Facilities	Senate/Filed for bills not passed 3/10/2016
S.B. 189	Death Penalty Amendments	Senate/Filed for bills not passed 3/10/2016
S.B. 209	Fifth District Court Judge	Senate/Filed for bills not passed 3/10/2016
S.B. 215	Motor Vehicle Amendments	Governor Signed 3/28/2016
S.B. 232	Rescue Medication in Schools	Enrolled 3/16/2016
SJR 13	Joint Resolution Amending Rules of Evidence	Senate/Filed for bills not passed 3/10/2016

He also was the Floor Sponsor for the following bills:

- H.B. 45 Stem Program Amendments
- H.B. 58 Hemp Extract Amendments
- H.B. 75 Epilepsy Training in Public Schools
- H.B. 156 Personalized License Plates Amendments
- H.B. 216 Utah Educational Savings Plan Amendments
- H.B. 234 Adoptive and Foster Parents Amendments
- H.B. 463 Personal Representative Amendments

=== Notable legislation ===
==== Anti-discrimination ====
Senator Urquhart sponsored S.B. 100, Anti-discrimination Amendments during the 2014 legislative session. Although this bill was kept in the Rules Committee, it was the topic of many conversations. 13 gay rights protesters seeking a hearing for the anti-discrimination bill were handcuffed and taken into custody by Utah Highway Patrol troopers Monday for blocking access to a legislative committee hearing while they were demanding for S.B.100 to be heard. Before the troopers took action shortly after 2 p.m., the protesters were told they were committing a potential felony and a class B misdemeanor by interfering with the hearing scheduled in the Senate Building on the Capitol grounds. Currently, Utah law prohibits workplace and housing discrimination based on race, color, religion, gender, pregnancy/childbirth, age, national origin, or disability. Senator Urquarts bill would add protections for sexual orientation/gender identity. People of any race, religion, sexual orientation, etc. still can be fired/evicted; but not because of their race, religion, sexual orientation, etc. In other words, if a person is otherwise qualified, housing and employment decisions should not be based on that person's sexual orientation/gender identity. This addition to the law is straightforward and simple. In Senator Urquharts own words, "without hurting anyone, it [SB100] will protect individuals. It will promote economic development. It is supported by a significant majority of Utahns."

==== Concurrent enrollment ====
Senator Urquhart also drafted SB 284, which focuses on Concurrent Enrollment for High School students. This made students pay not more than $30/credit hour—for credits that they concur in, which would still be at least an 80% subsidy. Amendment 3 exempts from that fee certain general education courses and youngsters who are eligible for free-and-reduced-lunch-eligibility program. Under SB 284, poor youngsters would be exempted from paying the fees, and no one would pay for fees for certain general education courses.

==== Death penalty ====
Senator Urquhart introduced S.B. 189 Death Penalty Amendments during the 2016 Legislative Session. The bill would have eliminated the death penalty as an option in Utah. Urquhart made the argument that sentencing someone to the death penalty is an arduous process that drags the victim's family through judicial mud. He also cited different cases where the murderer was elevated to rockstar status with everyone knowing their name, but not the victim's name. This bill passed out of the Senate, but was not considered in the House and therefore did not pass.

==== Hate crimes ====
Senator Urquhart introduced S.B. 107 Hate Crimes Amendments during the 2016 Legislative Session. Before it was presented on the Senate floor, the LDS Church spoke in opposition to any bills of this nature that might offset the balance of the Anti-Discrimination and Religious Liberties compromise from the prior session. This bill sought to expand protected categories for hate crimes, as well as bump up the punishment by one degree in the case that someone is found guilty of committing a hate crime. According to Urquhart, a hate crime is not simply a crime against an individual, but rather an entire community. This bill did not pass out of the Senate.

== Personal life ==
Urquhart is married to his wife Sara and has four children. He now lives in St. George, Utah.

Urquhart joined the Church of Jesus Christ of Latter Day Saints at age 10, and was a faithful member for decades. After experiencing personal turmoil in the 2010s, and a suicide attempt while working as a state senator, Urquhart was inspired to travel to Amsterdam with his wife to try ayahuasca. Finding ayahuasca and "magic mushrooms" healing, Urquhart organized The Divine Assembly as a religious non–profit in Utah.
