= Lynn A. Thompson =

American fundamentalist Mormon leader

President of the Priesthood of the Apostolic United Brethren
- September 2, 2014 – October 5, 2021
- Predecessor: J. LaMoine Jenson
- Successor: David Watson

Personal details
- Born: June 10, 1940
- Died: October 5, 2021 (aged 81)

Lynn A. Thompson (10 June 1940 – 5 October 2021) was the President of the Priesthood of the Apostolic United Brethren (AUB), a fundamentalist Mormon sect, from September 2, 2014, until October 5, 2021.

== Apostolic United Brethren ==
Thompson had been a member of the AUB's Priesthood Council under the leadership of Owen A. Allred and J. LaMoine Jenson. He assumed leadership of the Bluffdale, Utah, church, following the 2014 death of Jenson. Lynn Thompson died October 5, 2021.

== Allegations of abuse ==
In November 2014, Rosemary Williams, daughter of Thompson and cast member of the television show My Five Wives, accused Thompson of molesting her more than two decades ago. She said she remembered that he fondled her once when she was 12 years old. However, Rosemary stated that she did not plan to file a lawsuit or a criminal accusation as "she doesn't think it will do any good."

In response, Thompson denied the allegations when contacted by the Associated Press. AUB spokesman David Watson stated that the allegations against Thompson were being investigated by "other leaders in the church" and that "if there's criminal allegations that need to be turned over to local authorities, that's what we do."

== See also ==
- List of Mormon fundamentalist leaders

Apostolic United Brethren titles
Preceded by J. LaMoine Jenson	President of the Priesthood; September 2, 2014	Incumbent
