= Lee Perry =

Lee Perry may refer to:

- Lee Perry (politician) (born 1966), American politician in Utah
- Lee Perry (voice actor) (born 1959), Australian voice actor
- Lee "Scratch" Perry (1936–2021), Jamaican musician
- Lee Tom Perry (born 1951), American businessman and educator
