= Westlake High School (Utah) =

- Westlake High School emblem

Location
- 99 North Thunder Blvd. (200 West); Saratoga Springs, Utah 84045; United States; 40°21′51.20″N 111°55′17.13″W

Information
- Type: Public high school
- Motto: "Release the storm" 2016-2017 "Take the world by storm" 2017-2018 "Stay true to the blue" 2018-2019
- Opened: 20 August 2009; 17 years ago
- School district: Alpine School District
- CEEB code: 450004
- Principal: Matt King
- Teaching staff: 106.44 (FTE)
- Grades: 10-12
- Enrollment: 2,847 (2023-2024)
- Student to teacher ratio: 26.75
- Schedule: Eight period split schedule
- Hours in school day: 7.5
- Campus size: 73.207 acres (29.626 ha)
- Campus type: Suburban
- Colors: Carolina blue Vegas gold Navy blue
- Song: "Mighty Thunder"
- Athletics conference: 6A Region 4
- Mascot: Thor, the God of Thunder
- Team name: Thunder
- Rival: Cedar Valley High School
- Accreditation: Northwest Accreditation Commission
- Communities served: Cedar Fort, Eagle Mountain, Fairfield, Lehi, Saratoga Springs
- Feeder schools: Elementary schools: Thunder Ridge; Cedar Valley; Eagle Valley; Harvest Hills; Hidden Hollow; Mountain Trails; Pony Express; Sage Hills; Saratoga Shores; Middle school: Vista Heights; Lake Mountain
- Mission: Lux et Virtus "Light and Excellence"

Westlake High School (WHS) is a public high school located in Saratoga Springs, Utah, United States. It is part of Utah County's Alpine School District. The school first opened in 2009, serving students in grades 9 to 12. Starting with the 2013-14 school year, 9th grade students were assigned to Frontier Middle School in nearby Eagle Mountain.

== Athletics ==

Varsity sports for the Thunder include boys' baseball, boys' and girls' basketball, boys' and girls' cross country, boys' football, boys' and girls' golf, boys' and girls' soccer, girls' softball, boys' and girls' swim, boys and girls' tennis, boys' and girls' track & field, girls' volleyball, and boys' and girls' wrestling.

== Fine arts ==
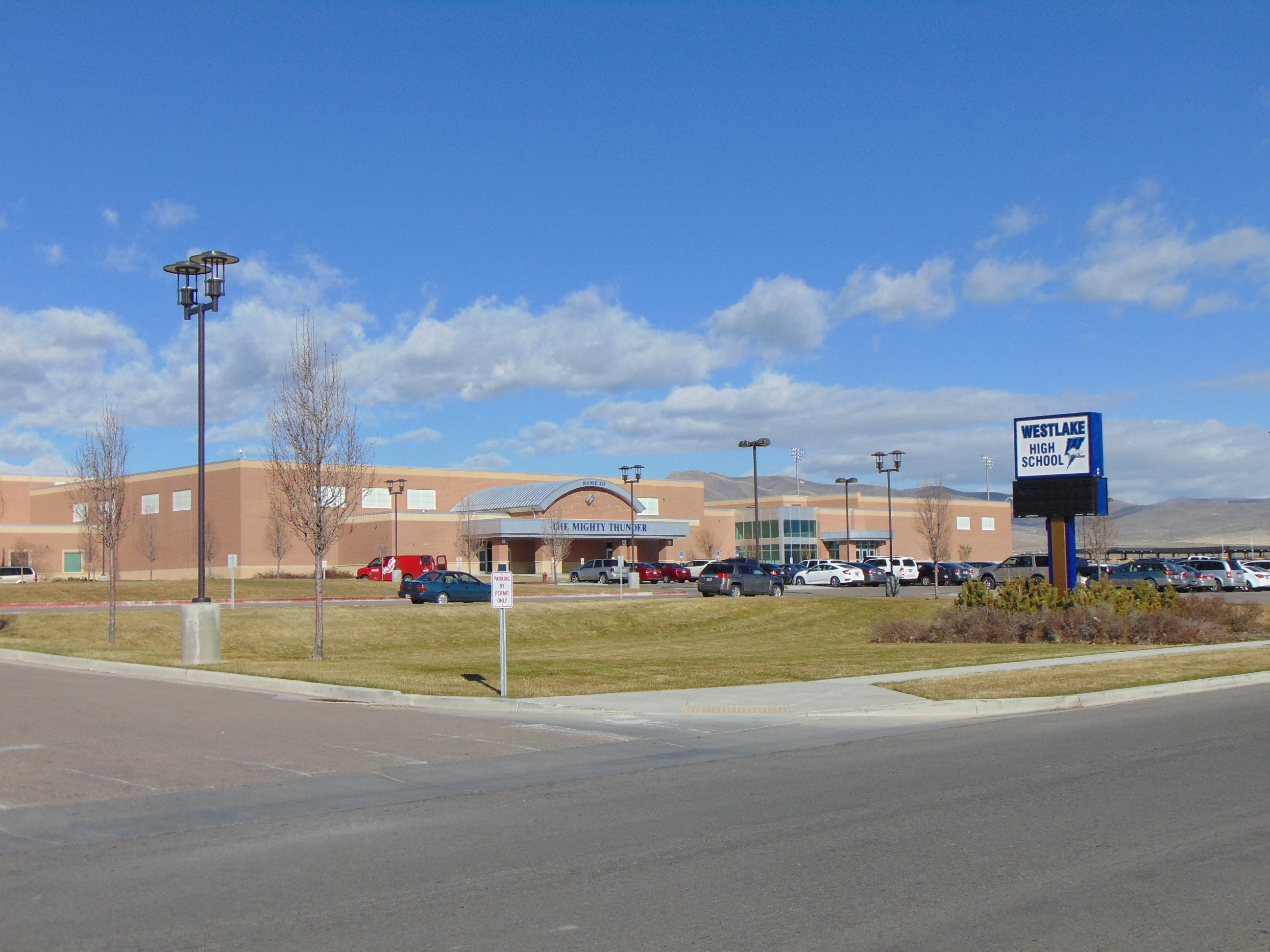
Looking northwest at West Lake High School, March 2016

In 2012, Westlake High School's marching band was the 4A State Champion with the show "Making of a Masterpiece," and were a Bands of America regional finalist at the St. George BOA regional, taking 10th place. The "Marching Thunder" repeated as Utah 4A State champion in 2013 with their show, "Our Town," and also placed 4th at the St George, Utah Bands of America Regional. During the 2013 season, the color guard won the "best guard" caption award in every competition entered by the Marching Thunder. With their show "Black Tears", they were a Bands of America regional finalist at the St. George and American Canyon, CA BOA regional, taking 7th place in St. George and 9th in American Canyon. They also placed third in the St. George preliminaries.

The Marching Thunder were invited to be the Utah representative to march in the Pearl Harbor Memorial parade in December 2014 and to march in the 2018 Rose Parade in Pasadena, California.

From 2022 on, the Marching Thunder showed an increase in both size of membership and advancement in placing in both regional and national competition. In 2016, they had traveled to the Bands of America Grand Nationals in Indianapolis and while performing well, placed 55th in the two day competition among just over 100 bands.

By 2022, the band had grown to well over 200 members and they placed 3rd at the St. George BOA regional. In 2023 they placed 2nd, with a school record 88.250 score. In 2024, they again placed 3rd in the St. George Regional with a score of 87.750, and then traveled again to the Bands of America Grand Nationals, where they scored an 84.725, an increase of almost 9 points from their 2016 trip and placing them .025 points and one place from competing in semi-finals of the competition.

== Notable alumni ==
- Garett Bolles - American football player

== See also ==
- List of high schools in Utah
