= Lance Allred =

American basketball player (born 1981)

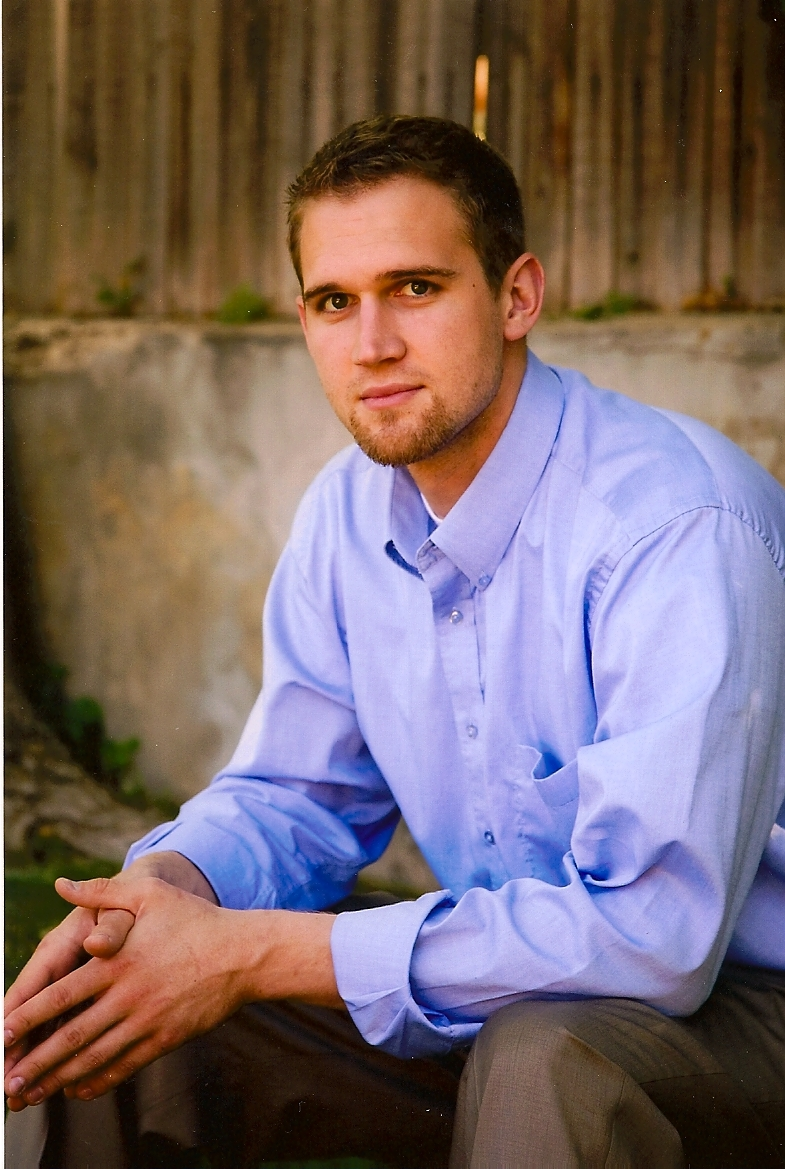
- Allred in 2011

Personal information
- Born: February 2, 1981 (age 45) Pinesdale, Montana, U.S.
- Listed height: 6 ft 11 in (2.11 m)
- Listed weight: 255 lb (116 kg)

Career information
- High school: Salt Lake East (Salt Lake City, Utah)
- College: Utah (2000–2002); Weber State (2003–2005)
- NBA draft: 2005: undrafted
- Playing career: 2005–2016
- Position: Power forward / center
- Number: 41

Career history
- 2005: SPO Rouen Basket
- 2006: JL Bourg-en-Bresse
- 2006: Club Bàsquet Llíria
- 2006–2010: Idaho Stampede
- 2007: Grises de Humacao
- 2008: Cleveland Cavaliers
- 2009: Scavolini Pesaro
- 2010: Maroussi Athens
- 2010–2011: Utah Flash
- 2011: Trotamundos de Carabobo
- 2011: Otago Nuggets
- 2011–2012: Kyoto Hannaryz
- 2012–2013: Fuerza Regia
- 2013: Trotamundos de Carabobo
- 2013–2014: Halcones de Xalapa
- 2014: Al Rayyan Doha
- 2014–2016: Leones de Ponce

Career highlights
- 2× NBA D-League All-Star (2008, 2009); All-NBA D-League Second Team (2008); All-NBA D-League Third Team (2009); Japan BJ-League All-Star (2012); 3× LNBP All-Star (2013–2015)
- Stats at NBA.com
- Stats at Basketball Reference

Lance Collin Allred (born February 2, 1981) is an American former professional basketball player, who was the first deaf player to play an NBA game. Allred is legally deaf, with 75%–80% hearing loss due to Rh complications at birth. He is also an inspirational speaker and author, with his first book, Longshot: The Adventures of a Deaf Fundamentalist Mormon Kid and His Journey to the NBA, published by HarperCollins in 2009.

== Early years ==
Allred was born in Pinesdale, Montana, a fundamentalist Mormon polygamist commune. Allred's father is a high school history teacher. He is the grandson of Rulon C. Allred, a prophet of the Apostolic United Brethren, a fundamentalist polygamous sect. Rulon was born in Colonia Dublán, Chihuahua, Mexico, which allowed Allred to receive Mexican citizenship.

Allred's family moved to Salt Lake City when he was seven. He started playing organized basketball in eighth grade, when he joined a team in the local LDS Church league.

Allred's skills developed quickly. His height was nearly seven feet. He played basketball at East High School in Salt Lake City. During his senior year, he averaged 17.3 points, 9.8 rebounds, 3.4 assists, and 1.7 blocks per game, earning several honors for his performance. He was named 1999 Gatorade Player of the Year for the state of Utah, and earned First Team All-State selection in Class 4A by both The Salt Lake Tribune and the Deseret News. Also, Allred was ranked as the "Best in the West" at the center position by Pac-West Hoops, and was listed as a Top 100 Recruit by CNN/Sports Illustrated. He was recruited by multiple schools and chose to attend the University of Utah.

== Basketball career ==
=== College career ===
Allred played in just 17 games, averaging 2.2 points and 1.8 rebounds in only 5.6 minutes per game during his freshman year. The following season (2001–02), his playing time increased slightly, and he averaged 1.0 point and 1.1 rebounds per game. At the end of his sophomore year, he transferred to Weber State University in Ogden, Utah. After transferring, Allred accused Utah coach Rick Majerus of constant verbal abuse, usually focused on Allred's deafness. Allred told The Salt Lake Tribune that Majerus had once said: "Lance, you've weaseled yourself through life using your hearing as an excuse. You're a disgrace to cripples. If I was a cripple in a wheelchair and saw [the way] you play basketball, I'd shoot myself." Two other Utah players confirmed some of what Allred claimed, but two assistant coaches said they never heard it. Majerus denied the allegations while describing the statements as "extremely insensitive." An investigation concluded that Majerus did not discriminate against Allred.

Allred saw increased playing time as a junior and averaged 11.7 points and 6.0 rebounds per game for the Wildcats. He focused on his weight and strength in the offseason, building enough muscle to increase his weight from 240 pounds to about 270. In his senior year (2004–05) he led his team with 17.7 points and 12.0 rebounds per game. He ranked third in the nation in rebounding, trailing only Paul Millsap and Andrew Bogut. Weber State eventually made it to the championship game of the Big Sky Conference Tournament, where the Wildcats lost by two points. For his efforts, he was named First Team All-Big Sky and also First Team All-Utah by the Deseret News.

=== Professional career ===
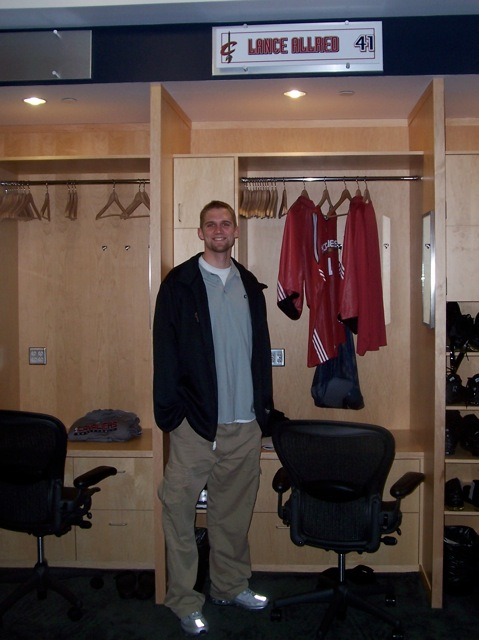
Allred in the Cleveland Cavaliers locker room

Allred began his professional career as an injury replacement for the French LNB club SPO Rouen Basket. He averaged 5.5 points and 3.9 rebounds in 11 games played. In January 2006, Allred was an injury replacement for another LNB club, JL Bourg Basket. In four games he averaged 2.5 points and 1.5 rebounds. Allred then played for Club Bàsquet Llíria of the Spanish LEB2 league, averaging 15.0 points (on 60.2% shooting) and 7.2 rebounds in 10 games.

In 43 games (19 starts) with the Idaho Stampede of the NBA D-League, Allred averaged 10.1 points on .524 shooting, and 5.7 rebounds in 20.9 minutes per game.

In 38 games (all starts) with the Idaho Stampede, Allred averaged 16.2 points on 51.2% shooting, 10.0 rebounds, and 1.4 assists in 29.6 minutes per game. He was named to the 2008 D-League's Red All-Star Team and was also the winner of the D-League's Dream Factory Friday night inaugural game of H.O.R.S.E. He won the game using bank shots on all of his attempts, claiming the first official H.O.R.S.E. title awarded in 30 years.

On March 13, 2008, the NBA's Cleveland Cavaliers signed Allred to a ten-day contract, making Allred the first legally deaf player in NBA history. Allred made his debut for the Cavaliers on March 17, 2008, missing his only field goal attempt during 18 seconds of action. On March 25, 2008, the Cavaliers signed Allred to a second ten-day contract. On April 4, Allred was signed for the remainder of the 2007–08 season.

After entering training camp with the Cavaliers for the 2008–09 season, he was released after playing in the preseason debut against the Toronto Raptors, where he made 1 rebound and blocked 1 shot in 4 minutes and 10 seconds of play. Allred began the regular season outside the NBA, with a return to the Idaho Stampede. Allred signed with Italian NSB Napoli during the summer of 2009. In October he signed a 60-day contract with Scavolini Pesaro.

In January 2010, he returned to Idaho to play the remainder of the season with the Idaho Stampede.

In 2011, Allred played for the New Zealander Otago Nuggets of the National Basketball League. He then signed with Kyoto Hannaryz, in Japan for the 2011–12 season. In 2012, Allred signed with Fuerza Regia of Mexico.

=== National team career ===
Allred joined the (Deaf team)/Mexico national team for the 2014 Central American and Caribbean Games.

== Speaker ==
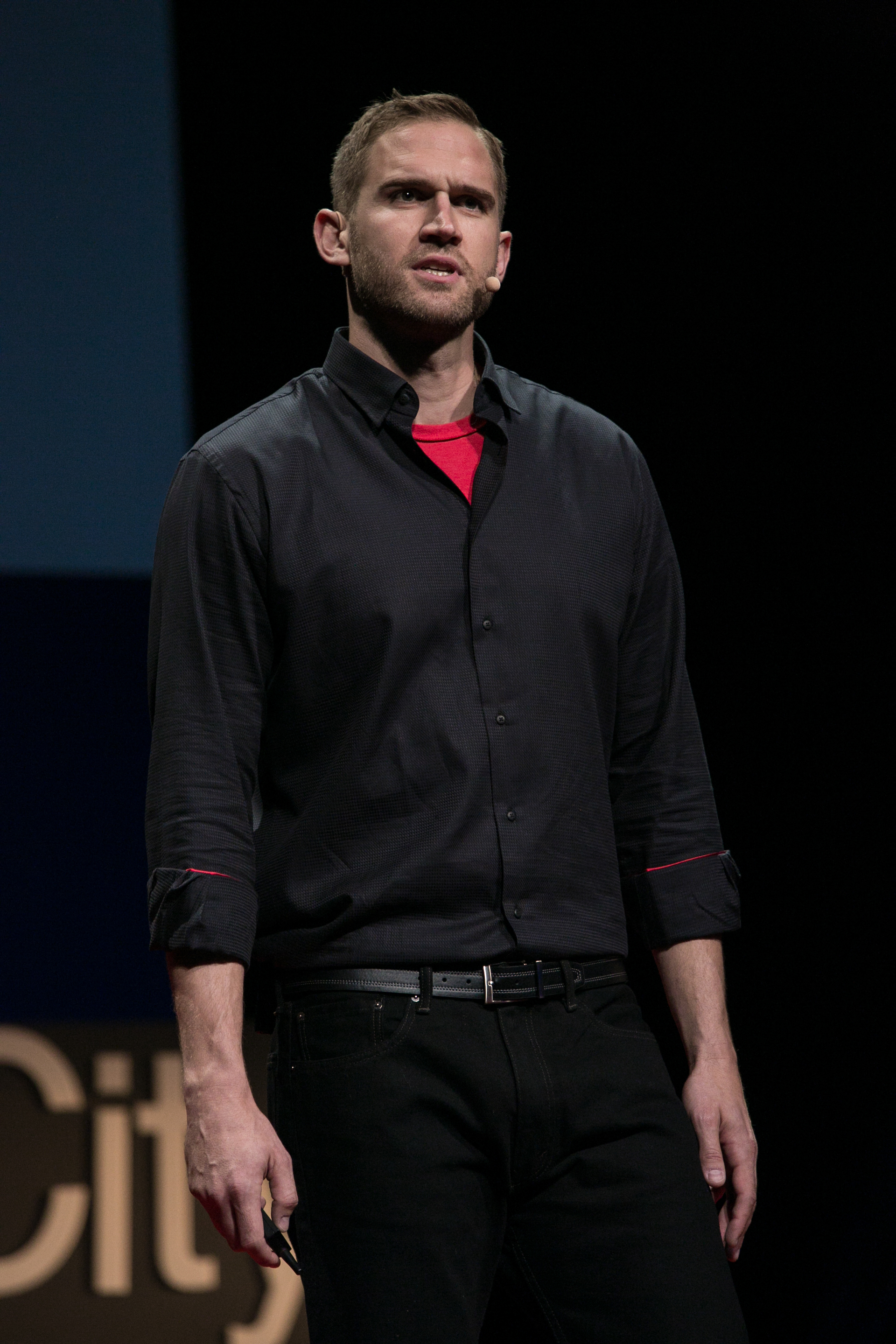
Lance Allred speaking at TEDx Salt Lake City 2016

After his final season in Puerto Rico, with Leones de Ponce, Allred retired from basketball and established his own LLC, L Squared Productions. He began working as a keynote motivational speaker and television and radio sports analyst in his home state of Utah. In August 2015, Allred was asked to join the American Program Bureau, the oldest speakers' bureau in the world.

Allred released his second book, Basketball Gods: The Transformation of the Enlightened Jock, on Amazon in 2016.

Allred speaks to corporations, conventions, non-profits, and schools on topics including leadership and perseverance. On September 17, 2016, he spoke at TEDxSaltLakeCity, delivering the presentation, "What is your Polygamy?". reaching 1 million views in less than 2 months. In March 2017, Allred released his third full-length book, How to Give the Million View TEDx Talk: What is Your Polygamy? Allred is also writing two books, a 14th-century historical novel and a Victorian satire.

Allred's fifth book, The New Alpha Male: How to Win the Game When the Rules are Changing, was published in March, 2020 by Sounds True Publishers.

== Personal life ==
Allred's autobiography was published in 2009: Longshot: The Adventures of a Deaf Fundamentalist Mormon Kid and His Journey to the NBA. The book focuses on his early years in a polygamous sect, overcoming obsessive–compulsive disorder, and his career in the NBA despite legal deafness.

He competed in the 2002 World Deaf Basketball Championship in Athens, Greece, where Team USA finished in second place.

== NBA career statistics ==
Legend
GP	Games played	GS	Games started	MPG	Minutes per game
FG%	Field goal percentage	3P%	3-point field goal percentage	FT%	Free throw percentage
RPG	Rebounds per game	APG	Assists per game	SPG	Steals per game
BPG	Blocks per game	PPG	Points per game	**Bold**	Career high

=== Regular season ===
Year	Team	GP	GS	MPG	FG%	3P%	FT%	RPG	APG	SPG	BPG	PPG
2007–08	Cleveland	3	0	3.3	.250	.000	.500	.3	.0	.0	.0	1.0
Career		3	0	3.3	.250	.000	.500	.3	.0	.0	.0	1.0

== See also ==
- Miha Zupan, a deaf Slovenian basketball player who also plays professionally alongside hearing people
