= Alpine School District =

Public school district in Utah County, Utah, United States

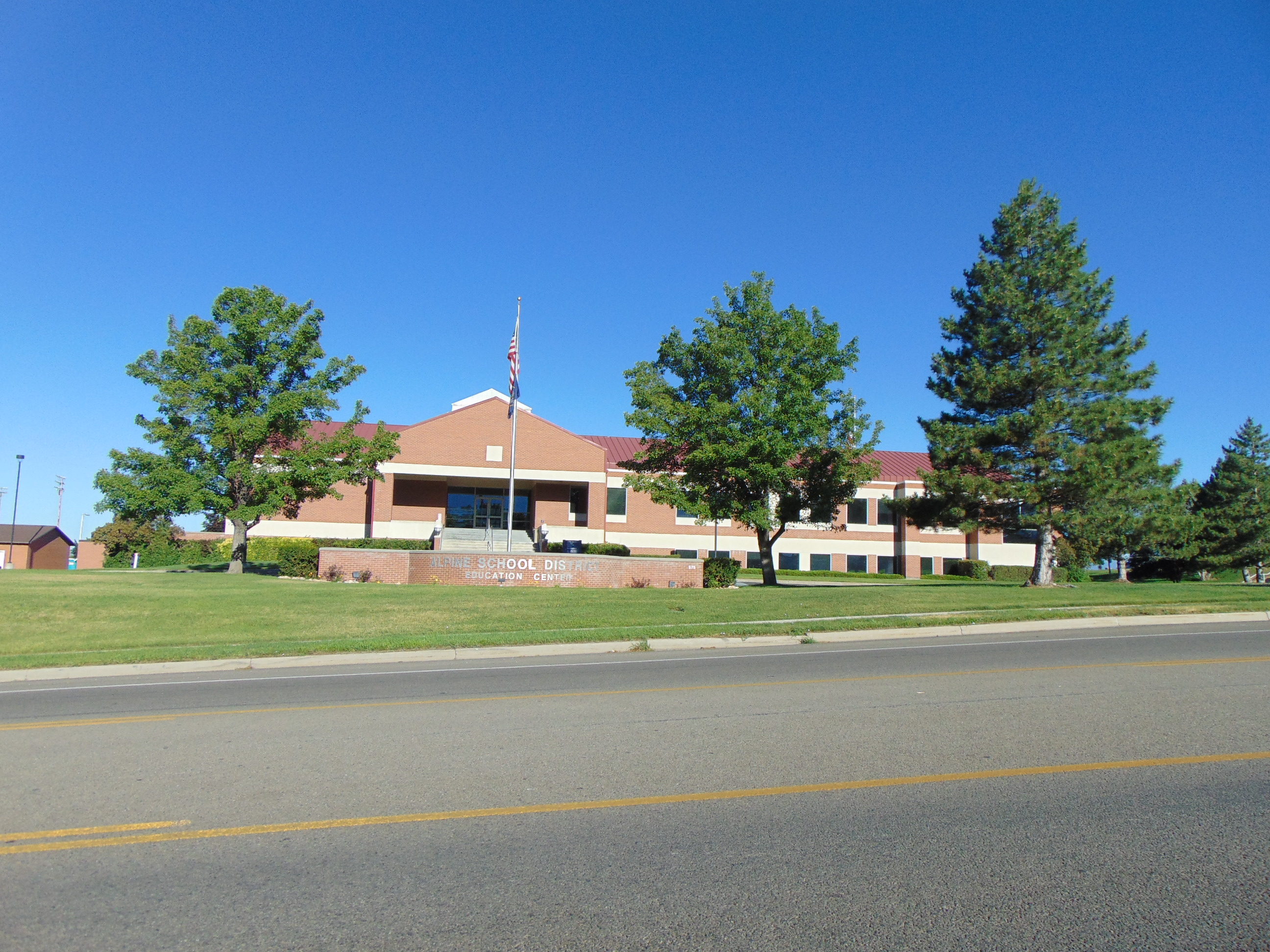
- Alpine School District Education Center (headquarters)

Location
- 575 North 100 East; American Fork, Utah United States
- Coordinates: 40.3884°N 111.7963°W

District information
- Established: 1915
- Superintendent: Rob Smith

Other information
- Website: alpineschools.org

Alpine School District is the primary school district in northern Utah County, Utah, United States.

The district was founded in 1915, and includes all grades from kindergarten through high school (K–12). As of 2018, there were 58 elementary schools, 14 junior high schools, 11 high schools, and 9 special purpose schools serving approximately 78,659 students, making it the largest school district in Utah.

In November of 2022, Orem City put the issue of splitting from the Alpine School District on the ballot. This new district would also potentially include the City of Lindon. Over 73% of voters did not approve of this plan. On the ballot for the year 2024, two propositions arose, which would lead to Alpine School District's split. However, notable cities such as Pleasant Grove, Lindon, and Orem were excluded from this vote, in order to prevent the district's split. Following the success of the two propositions organized by cities in north-central and western parts of the district, with around 60% of voters in for each voting to split, the Alpine School District will split into three new districts which are anticipated to begin operation for the 2027–28 school year.

== Structure ==
The district is governed by a board of education which consists of a seven-member group of citizens elected to four-year terms. The day-to-day operations of the district are managed by a superintendent. As of 2021, the district superintendent is Shane Farnsworth.

As of 2018, the district has ten large high schools, and only seven school board members, leading some parents and students to express concerns over inadequate representation on the school board. As of 2018, a member of the Alpine School Board represents more people than a member of the state legislature in the house. Also given concerns about conflicting needs in various parts of the district (e.g., declining enrollment in the southeast and growing populations in the west), many community members would like to see the district split into two or three new school districts, allowing more direct control over their local schools.

The district offices are located in American Fork. The district boundary includes: American Fork, Alpine, Cedar Fort, Cedar Hills, Eagle Mountain, Fairfield, Highland, Lehi, Lindon, Orem, Pleasant Grove, Saratoga Springs, Sundance, and Vineyard. The district also includes north-east portions of Provo including most of Provo Canyon, and the portions of Bluffdale and Draper that are within Utah County.

== History ==
The district was created in 1915 with 92 teachers, 4,906 students, 21 grade schools, and four secondary schools: Lehi High School, American Fork High School, Pleasant Grove High School (Utah), and Spencer School (Orem).

Its name and original boundaries were taken from the Alpine Stake of the Church of Jesus Christ of Latter-day Saints.

=== 2023 book controversy ===
In the summer of 2022, Alpine School District made headlines after removing 52 books by 41 authors from school libraries, 42% of which "feature LBGTQ+ characters and or themes" in addition to "sensitive content" as described under a new state law. Another 32 books will be subjected for cover-to-cover review by autumn to determine if the books will remain available to students.

A total of 275 books were initially selected for review following the implementation of a new law, H.B. 374, "Sensitive Materials In Schools". All 275 books had previously received parental complaints and urging from Utah Parents United saying the titles "are inappropriate for children." Following guidance from the Office of the Attorney General, "an internal library audit determined that [the questioned books] contain 'sensitive material' ... and 'do not have literary merit.'" In addition to removing the books from school libraries, Utah Parents United curriculum director Brooke Stephens "also filed a police report ... to report a list of 47 books" she claimed to contain pornographic material.

Alpine School District spokesman David Stephenson indicated that the books have been temporarily "placed away from students (who are currently out for summer break) until Alpine can conduct a 'review of content.'" Critics of the policy claim "it is a violation to remove the books before [the internal review of content]." Utah Parents United and other supporters have applauded the books' removal and have characterized the questioned material as pornographic.

According to the Utah Library Association (ULA), however, "removal of these ... books does not seem to be in accordance with the law" and some of the questioned books were found in other cases to have literary merit. Critics also characterized the review as hasty, question if proper policies were followed, and claim the questioned books may be helpful or enlightening to some students.

=== 2023 Title IX review ===
In September 2023, the Department of Education's Office for Civil Rights sent a 21-page letter to the superintendent of Alpine School District. This letter detailed the district's failing results of a compliance review that took place from 2017 to 2020, regarding failures to comply with Title IX in matters of sexual misconduct by adult employees of the district toward students, and similar misconduct between students.

The report found eight violations of Title IX and three concerns related to compliance with Title IX. This letter used five employee-to-student sexual harassments and assaults and more than 100 student-to-student harassment incidents, of which eighty-eight were sexual assault, over the review period of 2017–2020 to illustrate the district's failings. In many of these instances, the district failed to report the issue or investigate incidents as required by Title IX.

In multiple cases, the offending adults were permitted to retire or resign, with no legally mandated investigation and no notes made on the teacher's license. Alpine School District has until January 2024 to make the required changes from the report.

=== School closure controversy ===
In 2023, a group of parents sued the Alpine School District, alleging possible violation of state law regarding closure or consolidation of schools with low numbers of students. The district is accused of secretly planning on closing schools without giving proper notification to the public, while falsely giving the public impression the district was only studying possible boundary changes for existing schools and no closures were definitely planned.

When most district officials failed to appear for a requested meeting with state legislators, the Administrative Rules Review and General Oversight Committee issued subpoenas compelling the testimony of superintendent Farnsworth and the entire school board.

Utah state senator Curt Bramble was paraphrased by local media as saying "it appeared as though the [school] board had made a decision and then went through the motions of studying the issue." State representative Luz Escamilla was quoted as saying the district's leadership appeared to be engaged in a "cover-up."

=== Split ===
During the 2024 general election, there were ballot measures in the northern communities of the Alpine school district to split off into their own school districts. Proposition 11, if passed, would create a new school district consisting of Alpine, American Fork, Cedar Hills, Highland, and Lehi, as well as the Utah County portions of Draper. Proposition 14, if passed would create a new school district consisting of Cedar Fort, Eagle Mountain, Fairfield, and Saratoga Springs. Lindon, Orem, Pleasant Grove, and Vineyard did not have a ballot measure and would be organized into their own district if the other cities passed Propositions 11 and 14. As of Nov 6, 2024, it appeared the ballot measures would pass.

The election results were certified by November 19, 2024 and the split was confirmed. Each new district will elect school board members in 2025, followed by other procedural tasks such as proportional division of district assets and liabilities. The new districts are scheduled to begin operating in the 2027–28 school year.

== List of schools ==
=== Elementary schools ===
- Alpine (Alpine)
- Aspen (Orem)
- Barratt (American Fork)
- Belmont (Lehi)
- Black Ridge (Eagle Mountain)
- Bonneville (Orem)
- Brookhaven (Eagle Mountain)
- Cascade (Orem)
- Cedar Ridge (Cedar Hills)
- Cedar Valley (Cedar Fort)
- Centennial (Orem)
- Central (Pleasant Grove)
- Cherry Hill (Orem)
- Deerfield (Cedar Hills)
- Desert Sky (Eagle Mountain)
- Dry Creek (Lehi)
- Eagle Valley (Eagle Mountain)
- Eaglecrest (Lehi)
- Foothill (Orem)
- Forbes (American Fork)
- Fox Hollow (Lehi)
- Freedom (Highland)
- Greenwood (American Fork)
- Grovecrest (Pleasant Grove)
- Harbor Point (Saratoga Springs)
- Harvest (Saratoga Springs)
- Hidden Hollow (Eagle Mountain)
- Highland (Highland)
- Legacy (American Fork)
- Lehi (Lehi)
- Liberty Hills (Lehi)
- Lindon (Lindon)
- Manila (Pleasant Grove)
- Meadow (Lehi)
- Mount Mahogany (Pleasant Grove)
- Mountain Trails (Eagle Mountain)
- North Point (Lehi)
- Northridge (Orem)
- Orchard (Orem)
- Orem (Orem)
- Parkside (Orem)
- Pony Express (Eagle Mountain)
- Ridgeline (Highland)
- Riverview (Saratoga Springs)
- River Rock (Lehi)
- Rocky Mountain (Lindon)
- Sage Hills (Saratoga Springs)
- Saratoga Shores (Saratoga Springs)
- Sego Lily (Lehi)
- Shelley (American Fork)
- Snow Springs (Lehi)
- Springside (Saratoga Springs)
- Suncrest (Orem)
- Thunder Ridge (Saratoga Springs)
- Trailside (Vineyard)
- Traverse Mountain (Lehi)
- Vineyard (Vineyard)
- Westfield (Alpine)
- Westmore (Orem)
- Windsor (Orem)

=== Junior high/middle schools ===
- American Fork Junior High (American Fork)
- Canyon View Junior High (Orem)
- Frontier Middle School (Eagle Mountain)
- Lake Mountain Middle School(Saratoga Springs)
- Lakeridge Junior High School (Orem)
- Lehi Junior High School (Lehi)
- Mountain Ridge Junior High School (Highland)
- Oak Canyon Junior High (Lindon)
- Orem Junior High (Orem)
- Pleasant Grove Junior High (Pleasant Grove)
- Sage Canyon Middle School (Eagle Mountain)
- Timberline Middle School (Alpine)
- Viewpoint Middle School (Lehi)
- Vista Heights Middle School (Saratoga Springs)
- Willowcreek Middle School (Lehi)

=== High schools ===
- American Fork High School (American Fork)
- Cedar Valley High School (Eagle Mountain)
- Lehi High School (Lehi)
- Lone Peak High School (Highland)
- Mountain View High School (Orem)
- Orem High School (Orem)
- Pleasant Grove High School (Pleasant Grove)
- Skyridge High School (Lehi)
- Timpanogos High School (Orem)
- Westlake High School (Saratoga Springs)

=== Alternative schools ===
- Alpine Adult Education
- Alpine Online K–8
- ATEC East (American Fork)
- ATEC West (Saratoga Springs)
- Dan Peterson (severely disabled students) (American Fork)
- East Shore (online school and alternative school) (American Fork)
- Horizon (Preschool–12) (Saratoga Springs)
- Polaris High School (alternative school) (American Fork)
- Summit (alternative school) (American Fork)

== See also ==
- List of school districts in Utah
- Nebo School District
- Provo City School District
