= Garett Bolles =

American football player (born 1992)

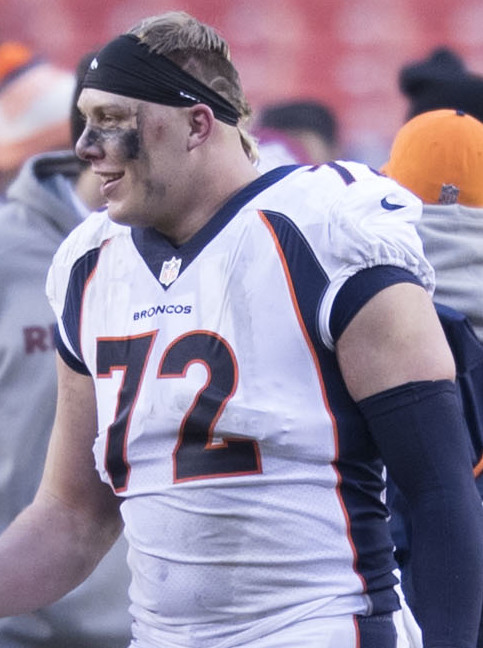
- Bolles with the Denver Broncos in 2017

No. 72 – Denver Broncos
- Position: Offensive tackle
- Roster status: Active

Personal information
- Born: May 27, 1992 (age 34); Walnut Creek, California, U.S.
- Listed height: 6 ft 5 in (1.96 m)
- Listed weight: 300 lb (136 kg)

Career information
- High school: Westlake (Saratoga Springs, Utah)
- College: Snow (2014–2015); Utah (2016)
- NFL draft: 2017: 1st round, 20th overall pick

Career history
- Denver Broncos (2017–present)

Awards and highlights
- First-team All-Pro (2025); Second-team All-Pro (2020); Pro Bowl (2025); PFWA All-Rookie Team (2017); First-team All-Pac-12 (2016)

Career NFL statistics as of Week 5, 2026
- Games played: 138
- Games started: 138
- Stats at Pro Football Reference

Garett Bolles (born May 27, 1992) is an American professional football offensive tackle for the Denver Broncos of the National Football League (NFL). He played college football for the Snow College Badgers and Utah Utes. He was selected by the Broncos in the first round of the 2017 NFL draft.

== Early life ==
Bolles was born in Walnut Creek, California on May 27, 1992. His family moved to Lehi, Utah. After being kicked out of his father's home, Bolles was picked up by the Freeman family, and rebuilt his life by reactivating himself as a member of the Church of Jesus Christ of Latter-day Saints. He attended Westlake High School in Saratoga Springs, Utah. Bolles played on the offensive and defensive lines in high school while also competing in lacrosse. While at Westlake, Bolles was arrested and suspended for three games after he and four other players extensively vandalized rival Lehi High School's football field.

Instead of playing college football straight out of high school, Bolles went on an LDS Church mission in Colorado Springs, Colorado.

== College career ==
Following his LDS Church mission, Bolles attended Snow College, where he played for the Badgers for two years before transferring to the University of Utah in 2016. Bolles earned NJCAA first-team All-America honors following his sophomore season at Snow College, starting all 11 games played. He was named the 2015 Western State Football League Offensive Player of the Year in addition to picking up All-WSFL first-team honors. Bolles helped Snow College finish No. 2 in the NJCAA rankings after winning the WSFL championship and Salt City Bowl.

Bolles signed with Utah as the No. 1 overall junior college prospect in 2016. Bolles was named to the All-Pac-12 Conference First-team in his only season with the University of Utah after opening all 13 games played (891 total snaps) at left tackle. He contributed to the Utes averaging close to 30 points per game and helped Utah's rushing offense rank third in the Pac-12 with 214.0 rushing yards per game. Bolles played on an offensive line that allowed just 2.1 sacks per game. After the season, Bolles decided to forgo his senior year and enter the 2017 NFL draft.

== Professional career ==
Bolles received an invitation to the NFL Combine as one of the top five offensive tackle prospects in the draft. He performed well and was able to raise his draft stock by showing athleticism in positional drills and having his 40-yard dash come under five seconds. Bolles completed every drill except for the bench press. He also participated at Utah's Pro Day and performed only positional drills for scouts and representatives in attendance. The majority of NFL Draft experts and analysts projected Bolles to be selected in either the first or second round. He was ranked the second best offensive tackle by ESPN and NFLDraftScout.com, was ranked the fourth best offensive tackle by Sports Illustrated, and was ranked the third best offensive tackle by NFL analysts Mike Mayock and Bucky Brooks.

Pre-draft measurables
Height	Weight	Arm length	Hand span	Wingspan	40-yard dash	10-yard split	20-yard split	20-yard shuttle	Three-cone drill	Vertical jump	Broad jump
6 ft 5 in (1.96 m)	297 lb (135 kg)	34 in (0.86 m)	9 3/8 in (0.24 m)	6 ft 9 in (2.06 m)	4.95 s	1.71 s	2.87 s	4.55 s	7.29 s	28 in (0.71 m)	9 ft 7 in (2.92 m)
All values from NFL Combine

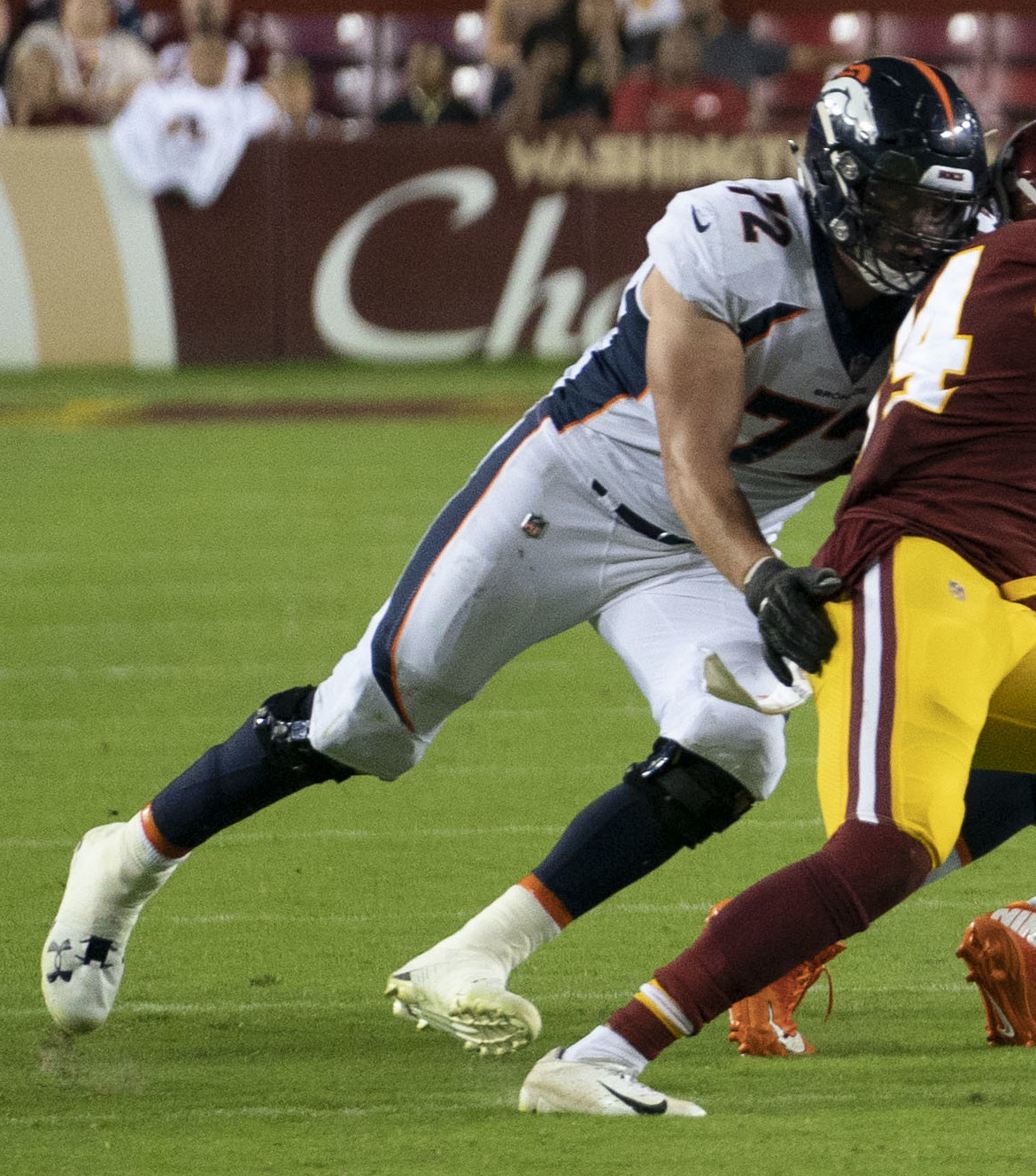
Bolles blocking in the 2018 NFL preseason.

Bolles was selected by the Denver Broncos in the first round (20th overall) of the 2017 NFL Draft. On May 11, 2017, Bolles signed a four-year, $11.01 million contract with $8.59 million guaranteed and a signing bonus of $6.16 million. Bolles opened all 16 games at left tackle to represent just the fifth time in team history a rookie left tackle started every game since starting lineups were tracked beginning in 1968. Bolles earned all-rookie honors from the PFWA, and was the sixth rookie to open the season at left tackle for the Broncos in Week 1.

Bolles started all 16 games at left tackle in 2018.

Bolles started all 16 games at left tackle in 2019 and played in all of Denver's offensive snaps. He was criticized publicly by general manager John Elway for repeatedly getting flagged for holding penalties, more than any other player in the NFL in his first three seasons in the league.

On May 1, 2020, the Broncos declined the fifth-year option on Bolles' contract, making him a free agent in 2021. On November 28, 2020, after improving greatly throughout the season, Bolles signed a four-year, $68 million contract extension with the Broncos. On January 8, 2021, Bolles was named as the second-team All-Pro left tackle.

Bolles appeared in and started 14 games in the 2021 season.

In Week 5 of the 2022 season against the Indianapolis Colts, Bolles suffered a broken leg and was placed on season-ending injured reserve on October 10, 2022.

In the 2023 season, Bolles started in all 17 games. He was also the Broncos' nominee for the 2023 Walter Payton Man of the Year award.

On December 12, 2024, the Broncos signed Bolles to a four-year, $82 million contract extension. He started all 17 games in the 2024 season.

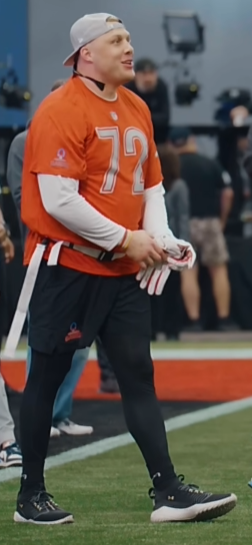
Bolles at the 2026 Pro Bowl Games

In the 2025 season, Bolles lead all NFL tackles with a 90.7 pass blocking grade and earned his first career Pro Bowl invite. He was voted the 42nd-best player in the league by his fellow players on the NFL Top 100 Players of 2026.

== NFL career statistics ==
Legend
**Bold**	Career high

Year	Team	Games		Offense					
Year	Team	GP	GS	Snaps	Pct	Holding	False start	Decl/Pen	Acpt/Pen
2017	DEN	16	16	1,106	98%	**7**	**4**	3	**12**
2018	DEN	16	16	1,062	99%	**7**	3	4	10
2019	DEN	16	16	1,015	**100%**	6	2	**7**	10
2020	DEN	15	15	1,015	**100%**	1	2	3	4
2021	DEN	14	14	870	99%	3	1	3	6
2022	DEN	5	5	325	96%	2	2	2	4
2023	DEN	17	17	1,072	**100%**	4	3	0	8
2024	DEN	17	17	1,068	97%	6	3	2	**12**
2025	DEN	17	17	**1,125**	99%	2	3	2	6
2026	DEN	5	5	308	100%	1	2	2	4
Career		138	138	8,966	99%	39	25	28	76

== Awards and honors ==
NFL

- First-team All-Pro (2025)
- Second-team All-Pro (2020)
- Pro Bowl (2025)
- NFLPA Alan Page Community Award (2026)
- PFWA All-Rookie Team (2017)

College

- First-team All-Pac-12 (2016)

== Personal life ==
As a former troubled youth, Bolles has made an effort to assist and mentor juveniles involved in the justice system. He has been actively involved in juvenile probation and court mentorship programs in Arapahoe County, and regularly attends court hearings and events at the Marvin W. Foote Youth Services Center. For his contributions, Bolles was awarded the Raymond C. Frenchmore Juvenile Law Award by the Arapahoe County Bar Association in June of 2023.

Bolles and his wife Natalie have three children, a son and two daughters. In 2021, his son was diagnosed with childhood apraxia of speech (CAS), a speech disorder that causes difficulty speaking from a young age. Bolles himself grew up dealing with ADHD. To support children with learning disabilities, Bolles founded the GB3 Foundation, a non-profit focused on improving their education strategies, mental health, and physical wellbeing. In August of 2025, Bolles and speech pathologist Jennie Bjorem opened the Bjorem & Bolles Apraxia Education Initiative training center, a facility made to assist educators and speech pathologists to diagnose and treat children with CAS. Following this, Bolles was named the NFLPA Community MVP for Week 1 of the 2025 NFL season. Bolles was also the recipient of the 2026 NFLPA Alan Page Community Award in recognition of his charity work.
