= David Lifferth =

American politician

Member of the Utah House of Representatives from the 2nd district
- In office January 1, 2013 – January 1, 2017
- Preceded by: Lee Perry
- Succeeded by: Jefferson Moss

Personal details
- Party: Republican
- Education: Brigham Young University (BS)
- Website: davidlifferth.ning.com

David E. Lifferth is an American politician who served as a member of the Utah House of Representatives for the 2nd district from January 2013 through January 2017. Lifferth was interim mayor of Eagle Mountain in 2005, and then a city councilman.

== Education ==
Lifferth earned a Bachelor of Science degree in business and information technology from Brigham Young University.

== Career ==
Lifferth works as a business analyst for The Church of Jesus Christ of Latter-day Saints. Prior to serving in the Utah House of Representatives, Lifferth was the interim mayor of Eagle Mountain for two months in 2005. He later became a city councilman and ran for his state-level office in 2012.

=== Utah Legislature ===
In 2012, with 2nd district incumbent Republican Representative Lee Perry redistricted to district 29, Lifferth was unopposed for both the June 26, 2012 Republican primary and the November 6, 2012 general election, winning with 10,924 votes.

In 2014, Lifferth ran unopposed in the Republican primary election. He faced Charles Christensen of the Independent American Party in the general election and defeated him.

During the 2015 and 2016 legislative sessions, Lifferth served on the Public Education Appropriations Subcommittee, the House Education Committee, and the House Transportation Committee. During the interim, Lifferth served on the Education Interim Committee as well as the Transportation Interim Committee.

Lifferth received national attention in April 2014 when he tweeted that the NAACP (NAACP) is racist because "any group that tries to advance specific people based on their race is by definition racist." He later apologized by saying, "My joke was in poor taste and insensitive to others. I have learned a lot in the past few days. The NCAAP(sic) is not a racist organization. My logic was flawed."

In 2016, Lifferth was briefly a candidate for the 13th district in the Utah State Senate, but suspended his campaign after the Utah Lieutenant Governor's Office concluded an investigation based on claims that Lifferth made against another candidate. The candidate whom Lifferth accused was cleared of wrongdoing.

== Personal life ==
Lifferth lives in Eagle Mountain, Utah with his wife, Mary.
