= Jamal Willis =

American football player (born 1972)

No. 24
- Position: Running back

Personal information
- Born: December 12, 1972 (age 53); Lawton, Oklahoma, U.S.
- Listed height: 6 ft 2 in (1.88 m)
- Listed weight: 218 lb (99 kg)

Career information
- High school: Bonanza (Las Vegas, Nevada)
- College: BYU

Career history
- San Francisco 49ers (1995–1996)

Career NFL statistics
- Games played: 11
- Games started: 1
- Rushing yards: 35
- Rushing average: 2.9
- Kickoff returns: 17
- Kickoff return yards: 427
- Kickoff return average: 25.1
- Stats at Pro Football Reference

Jamal Willis (born 1972) is a local level leader in the Church of Jesus Christ of Latter-day Saints and a former NFL football player. He also works in administration for the Alpine School District in Utah.

Willis was born in Oklahoma. He attended BYU on a football scholarship as a running back and joined the Church of Jesus Christ of Latter-day Saints while a student there. He played professional football for the San Francisco 49ers in 1995. He also served as a kickoff returner. His season was cut short after 11 games with a torn anterior cruciate ligament in his right knee in a game against the Carolina Panthers. He was cut by the 49ers after the first game of the 1996 season.

On January 7, 2018, Willis was called as a counselor in the Genesis Group presidency. Like all other members of the presidency, Willis is of African descent. He had not even previously attended the Group, but had been invited to attend while a student at BYU before he joined the LDS Church.

Starting in May 2001, Willis coached football for Payson High School until he was fired in November 2002. As of 2018, he lived in Saratoga Springs, Utah and worked as a school district administrator. As of 2026, Willis was working as assistant director of student wellness at Brigham Young University.

== Sources ==
- Pro Football Reference

Specific
