= Cedar Valley High School =

Location
- 1389 East Aviator Avenue; Eagle Mountain, Utah 84005; United States
- 40°19′17″N 112°01′04″W

Information
- Type: Public secondary school
- Established: 20 August 2019
- School district: Alpine School District
- Principal: Courtney Johnson
- Teaching staff: 77.27 (FTE)
- Grades: 10-12
- Enrollment: 3,400 (2023-24)
- Student to teacher ratio: 25.43
- Colors: Red and Steel Gray
- Team name: Aviators
- Rivals: Westlake High School
- Website: cvhs.alpineschools.org

Cedar Valley High School is a public high school in Eagle Mountain, Utah, United States. It serves students in grades 10-12 for the Alpine School District.

== History ==
Construction for the high school began in 2017, following the passage of a $387 million bond by voters in Alpine School District. Until the name Cedar Valley was decided in 2018, among a number of names, it was referred to as Eagle Mountain high school. The school cost $68.2 million to build.

Cedar Valley opened in the fall of 2019. Among the attendees at the opening ceremony were Representative Ben McAdams and "Candy Bomber" Gail Halvorsen.

== Athletics ==
Cedar Valley participates in sports sanctioned by the Utah High School Activities Association. The school's nickname is the Aviators. The school competes in Region 2 of class 6A. The colors are crimson red and black. The following sports are offered:

- Baseball (boys)
- Basketball (girls & boys)
- Cross Country (girls & boys)
- Football (boys)
- Marching band
- Soccer (girls & boys)
- Softball (girls)
- Tennis (girls & boys)
- Track & Field (girls & boys)
- Volleyball (girls & boys)
- Wrestling (co-ed)
- Swim (girls & boys)

== See also ==
- List of high schools in Utah
