= J. LaMoine Jenson =

American Mormon leader (1935–2014)

- J. LaMoine Jenson in 1990

President of the Priesthood of the Apostolic United Brethren
- February 14, 2005 – September 2, 2014
- Predecessor: Owen A. Allred
- Successor: Lynn A. Thompson

Personal details
- Born: June 27, 1935; Millville, Utah, United States
- Died: September 2, 2014 (aged 79); Eagle Mountain, Utah, United States
- Cause of death: Cancer
- Alma mater: Jordan High School
- Employer: Jenson Lumber
- Spouse(s): Including: Marillee Thompson; Marilyn Baker; Joy Rains
- Parents: Eslie D. Jenson

Joseph LaMoine Jenson (June 27, 1935 – September 2, 2014) was the leader of the Apostolic United Brethren (AUB), a Mormon fundamentalist polygamist group, from 2005 until his death.

== Personal life ==
Jenson was born in Millville, Utah, to Eslie D. Jenson, a member of the Priesthood Council of the Apostolic United Brethren under the leadership of Joseph W. Musser. Jenson grew up in the Salt Lake Valley and graduated from Jordan High School in 1953. Jenson went on to work in the building materials industry and owned the Jenson Lumber in Draper, Utah.

Jenson was a follower of the Apostolic United Brethren practice of Plural Marriage. He had at least three wives (Marillee Thompson, Marilyn Baker, and Joy Rains) and may have had more.

== Apostolic United Brethren leadership ==
Jenson was called as a member of the AUB's priesthood council in 1969 by then head Rulon C. Allred. Prior to assuming leadership of the Bluffdale, Utah church, Jenson had been a member of the AUB's Priesthood Council for 36 years. Prior to the death of AUB leader Owen A. Allred, Jenson was appointed by Allred as the Second Elder of the church and Allred's successor-designate.

== Death ==
Jenson died of cancer at his home in Eagle Mountain, Utah. Jenson had been suffering from cancer for almost five years, which has forced him to abandon the day-to-day operations of his lumber business.

== See also ==
- List of Mormon fundamentalist leaders

Apostolic United Brethren titles
Preceded by Owen A. Allred	President of the Priesthood; February 14, 2005—September 2, 2014	Succeeded by Lynn A. Thompson
