= Apostolic United Brethren =

Polygamous Mormon fundamentalist church

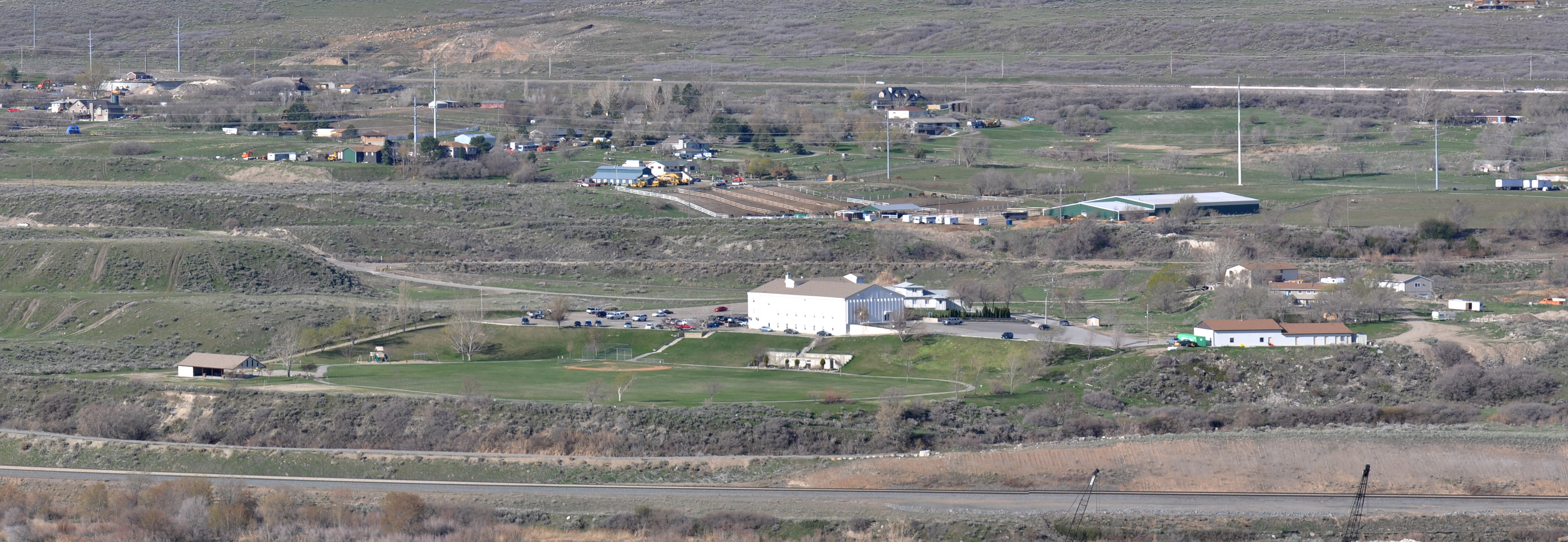
- The AUB headquarters in the Wasatch Range
- Abbreviation: AUB
- Classification: Restorationist
- Orientation: Latter Day Saint movement
- Theology: Mormon fundamentalism
- Polity: Hierarchical
- President of the Priesthood: David Watson
- Region: North America
- Headquarters: Bluffdale, Utah, U.S.
- Founder: Lorin C. Woolley (1929)
- Origin: April 6, 1830 (officially given); March 6, 1929 (as Woolley Group); 1975 (incorporated)
- Separated from: Council of Friends
- Members: 10,000+

The Apostolic United Brethren (AUB) is a Mormon fundamentalist group that practices polygamy.

The AUB has older roots, but became a distinct organization in the 1950s. The group has had a temple in Mexico since the 1990s, an endowment house in Utah since the early 1980s, and several other locations of worship to accommodate their members in the US states of Wyoming, Arizona, and Montana.

The title "Apostolic United Brethren" is not generally used by members, who prefer to call it "The Work", "The Priesthood", or "The Group". Those outside the faith sometimes refer to it as the "Allred Group" because two of its presidents shared that surname. Most members of the AUB do not refer to their organization as a "church" and, unlike nearly all other Mormon fundamentalist groups who reject the mainline the Church of Jesus Christ of Latter-day Saints (LDS Church) entirely, the AUB regards the mainline church as a legitimate divine institution, though wayward and diminished.

Religious scholar J. Gordon Melton characterised the group as "the more liberal branch of the Fundamentalist movement", as the group allows sexual relations apart from the strict purpose of procreation.

The group came into the Hollywood spotlight with the debut of the hit reality TV series Sister Wives in 2010. The show chronicles the lives of Kody Brown and his wives Meri, Janelle, Christine, and Robyn, who were AUB members for the first few years of the series. As of 2025, the show is in its 19th season and most of the Brown family are no longer AUB members.

The AUB furnished a detailed description of their beliefs and practices in August 2009 to the Utah Attorney General's "Polygamy Primer", which was later revised in 2011. This booklet is used to educate the law enforcement and social relief agencies involved with similar groups.

The AUB is unrelated to other similarly named groups such as Churches of the Brethren and Apostolic Pentecostals.

== Membership ==
As of 1998, there were approximately 10,000 members of the AUB, most of whom reside in Utah and Mexico. The headquarters of the AUB is in Bluffdale, Utah, where it has a chapel, a school, archives, and a sports field.

The AUB has communities in Rocky Ridge, Utah; Harvest Haven (a subdivision established on unincorporated Utah County land but later absorbed into Eagle Mountain, Utah); Cedar City, Utah; Granite Ranch, Juab County, Utah; Pinesdale, Montana; Lovell, Wyoming; Mesa, Arizona; Mount Pleasant, Utah; Southeast Idaho; and Ozumba, Mexico. It operates at least three private schools; many families also home-school or send their children to public or public charter schools.

The AUB's members tend to integrate with their surrounding communities, much more so than some other Mormon fundamentalists, such as members of the Fundamentalist Church of Jesus Christ of Latter-Day Saints (FLDS Church). This can largely be attributed to the AUB's former prophet, Owen A. Allred, and his desire to be upfront with local law enforcement and the news media, especially when it came to ending rumors of underage, arranged marriages that many other fundamentalist Mormon groups were known for. Allred believed that transparency was key in helping the community see that the AUB and its members were not a threat.

== Organization ==
The AUB is headed by a President of the Priesthood. Next in authority is a Priesthood Council (of which the President is a part). Below the Priesthood Council are Presidents of the Seventy, the Seventy quorum members, high priests, elders, Aaronic Priesthood members, the Women's Relief Society, Sunday School, Girls Class, Boy Scouts, and the Children's Primary organizations. On a local level there are Bishops, Priesthood Council representatives.

== Meetings ==
General Sacrament Meeting and Sunday School meetings (as well as many private family Sunday Schools) take place on Sundays, as do Priesthood meetings. Relief Society (a women's organization), Girls Class, Primary, and Scouting take place throughout the week.

Dances, firesides, musical events, plays, and classes are often held at meetinghouses.

== Doctrines and practices ==
The AUB regards the Book of Mormon as sacred scripture in addition to the Bible, and accepts the Articles of Faith written by Joseph Smith to summarize Latter Day Saint beliefs. The AUB teaches that the LDS Church is still fulfilling a divine role in spreading the Book of Mormon and other basic doctrines of Mormonism, and in facilitating genealogy.

Members of the AUB are known for their belief in plural marriage and what is commonly called the "1886 Meeting" ordering continual plural marriage despite government opposition. Other key beliefs include the United Order, the Adam–God doctrine, and the exclusion of black people from the priesthood. While not all members take part in plural marriage, it is considered a crucial step in the quest for obtaining the highest glory of heaven.

== Attitudes toward the LDS Church ==
AUB members regard the LDS Church as an important vehicle in spreading Mormonism's introductory teachings, particularly through the LDS Church's missionary program and the widespread publication of the Book of Mormon. The group's founder, Rulon C. Allred, told a fundamentalist congregation in 1966: "We are specifically instructed through John Taylor by Joseph Smith and Jesus Christ, and by Joseph Musser as well that we are not to interfere ... with the function of the [LDS] Church." On November 16, 1966, in another discourse, he commented: "[We] are not in a position to dictate to the [LDS] Church, or to presume that we preside over [LDS Church] President David O. McKay, or that we can send missionaries into the fields of labor, or that we can in any way dictate the affairs of the Church." "God's Church is the Church of Jesus Christ of Latter-day Saints", Allred declared. He further explained in 1975: "We are members of the Church of Jesus Christ of Latter-day Saints, no matter who may decry it or who may deny it." "We are functioning within the spiritual confines of the Church", he commented, "but we are definitely outside of its legal organization."

Under his leadership, the Allred group did no missionary work or temple work, leaving those responsibilities to the LDS Church. He predicted in 1975 that "the time is at hand when God is going to intervene in the matter, and the temples will be opened to us, and we will have our endowments and do our own work for our dead." Under his brother Owen's leadership, the AUB constructed its own endowment houses for ordinance work; this was in response to the LDS Church's policy change which extended priesthood and temple blessings to all races, change which caused Allred to exclaim "do not go into a temple that has been defiled by the Canaanite being invited into it" and to publish an ad listing several racial statements from Brigham Young and accusing the LDS Church of forgetting past revelations. Several LDS joined the AUB over such changes.

Drew Briney, an author on Mormon polygamy, former AUB member and appeals attorney, summarized AUB members' general sentiment toward the LDS Church:

The "AUB" accepts the mainstream LDS Church as Christ's Church but views it as "out of order" just as the Israelites were "out of order" at the time of Christ—still accepted, just somewhat prodigal. Its members are taught that they should not disparage the LDS Church and its leaders teach that "the mother church" should be respected by the "father" (AUB or "the priesthood") the same as a husband should take care of and honor a wayward wife inasmuch as he is able to do so. Incidentally, AUB's leaders commonly concede that no organization is exempt from being out of order to some degree (including the AUB) but they emphasize that the LDS Church has abandoned many doctrines taught by the early brethren—not just plural marriage. Some of these doctrines include: Adam-God teachings; united order or "full consecration"; proper conferral of the priesthood; the ban on blacks receiving the priesthood; the doctrine of dissolution; the kingdom of God as a separate organization from the Church; the ordinance of rebaptism; the ordinance of mother's blessings; giving a complete temple endowment (as opposed to the shortened version now administered in the LDS Church); the wearing of a full length, unaltered garment; the unchanging nature of all ordinances; prayer circles outside of the temple; and the law of adoption (sealing men to men as father/son).

== History ==
The AUB's claims to authority are based around the accounts of John Wickersham Woolley, Lorin Calvin Woolley and others, of a meeting in September 1886 between LDS Church president John Taylor, the Woolleys, and others. Prior to the meeting, Taylor is said to have met with Jesus Christ and the deceased church founder, Joseph Smith, and to have received a revelation commanding that plural marriage should not cease, but be kept alive by a group separate from the LDS Church. The following day, the Woolleys, as well as Taylor's counselor, George Q. Cannon, and others, were said to have been set apart to keep "the principle" alive, including sufficient priesthood authority to perform marriage sealings and pass on that authority.

Members of the AUB see their history as going back to Joseph Smith and to the beliefs he espoused and the practices he established. They believe that the LDS Church has made unacceptable changes to doctrines and ordinances. The members of the AUB see it as their responsibility to keep them alive in the form they were originally given and to live all the laws that God has commanded. Each doctrine or practice changed or abandoned by the LDS Church is in turn perpetuated by the AUB.

Until the 1950s, Mormon fundamentalists were largely one group, but with the ordination in 1951 of Rulon C. Allred by Joseph W. Musser, who then presided over the fundamentalists, the fundamentalists in Colorado City, Arizona (formerly known as Short Creek), became more distant. Within a few years they formed their own group, which is now the FLDS Church.

The shooting of Rulon C. Allred by Rena Chynoweth on May 10, 1977 (under the direction of Ervil LeBaron), brought the AUB into the spotlight. Allred was succeeded by his brother, Owen A. Allred, who died in February 2005 and was replaced by his appointed successor, J. LaMoine Jenson. Jenson died in September 2014 after a battle with colon cancer, and was replaced by his appointed successor, Lynn A. Thompson.

In 2016−2017, some AUB members in Pinesdale, Montana, split away from the main AUB and formed their own group with their own meetings; the breakaway group (which called itself "the Second Ward") objected to the leadership of Thompson who was accused of sexual misconduct. However, the dissident group and the main faction continued to jointly operate the private Pines Academy, which then had 129 students, as well as the municipal government.

Lynn Thompson died October 5, 2021. David Watson advanced to the Leader or Prophet of the Apostolic United Brethren upon the death of Thompson.

== Criticism and controversy ==
Rod Williams, a Secret Service agent involved in Watergate and a former member of the AUB, claimed in sworn testimony, as part of the Virginia Hill lawsuit, that he stole copies of LDS Church's temple ordinances from the Seattle Temple at the behest of Owen Allred, a claim denied by Allred.

According to one former member, attorney John Llewellyn, "plural wives [of AUB men] are sent into nearby Hamilton to apply for welfare as single mothers. The informant reported that welfare checks are often taken directly to the priesthood leaders."

In 2014, after Lynn A. Thompson assumed leadership of the AUB, he was accused of fondling his daughter Rosemary Williams when she was 12 years old, and shortly thereafter two of his nieces also said he had sexually abused them too. An individual within the AUB also alleged that Thompson embezzled up to $500,000 in tithing funds and other church funds and that he used official Church accounts for personal expenditures. An audit confirmed Thompson had embezzled funds before becoming AUB's leader. In March 2019, Pinesdale Academy, the church's school in Pinesdale, Montana, required teachers to pledge support for Thompson or else they were let go. The church required its members to make the same pledge, causing many people to leave the church as well. Thompson died in October 2021.

== Leaders ==
Council of Friends

- John W. Woolley (founding–1928)
- Lorin C. Woolley (1928–1934)
- J. Leslie Broadbent (1934–1935)
- John Y. Barlow (1935–1949)
- Joseph White Musser (1935–1954) The Apostolic United Brethren does not recognize the presiding authority of John Y. Barlow (1935–1949) even though he did lead. Instead they believe Musser was Broadbent's rightful successor.

Apostolic United Brethren

- Rulon C. Allred, founder of Apostolic United Brethren (1954–1977)
- Owen A. Allred (1977–2005)
- J. LaMoine Jenson (2005–2014)
- Lynn A. Thompson (2014–2021)
- David Watson (2021–present)

== Notable members, former members or adherents ==
- Lance Allred
- Ralph Gean
- The Brown family of the television show Sister Wives

== See also ==
- Factional breakdown: Mormon fundamentalist sects
- List of Mormon fundamentalist churches
- List of Mormon fundamentalist leaders
