= Mountain Ranch Bike Park =

Public park in Utah, USA

Coordinates: 40°21′16″N 111°58′41″W

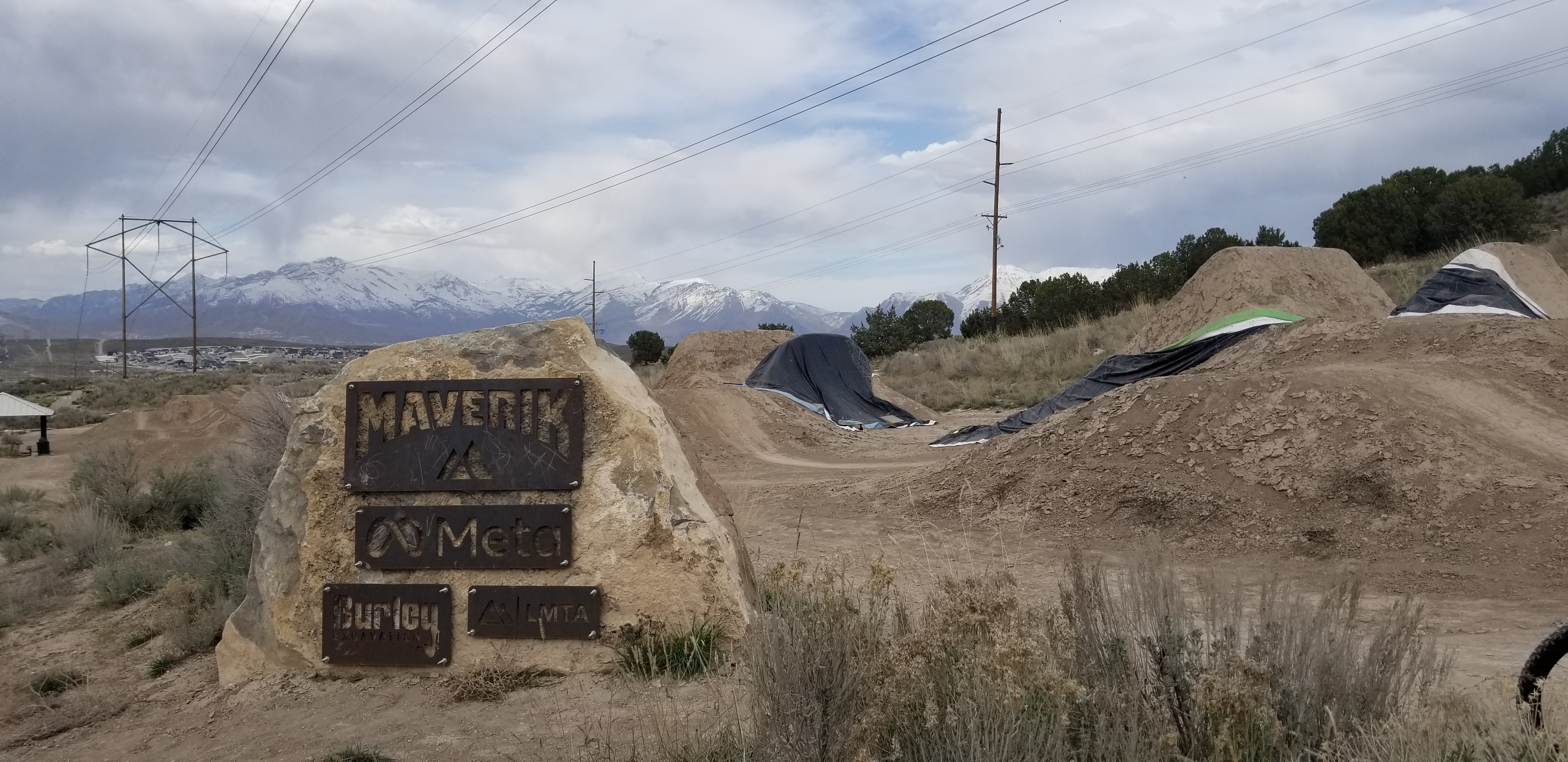
Mountain Ranch Bike Park dirt jumps and sponsors.

Mountain Ranch Bike Park, located in Eagle Mountain, Utah, United States, is a city park designed for mountain bikers of all skill levels. The park features dirt jumps, a pump track, two slope style trails, a skills area and a single track trail with wood features.

== Trails ==
The green 110 trail is a slope style trail that features small jumps and banked turns.

The blue Juniper trail is a network of single track trails that winds through the juniper trees. The trail contains wood features for more advanced riders, and routes around the wood features for the less experienced rider.

The black 220 trail is a more advanced slope style trail which starts with a drop-off of a ladder bridge. The trail has large banked turns, gap jumps, table tops, and double jumps.

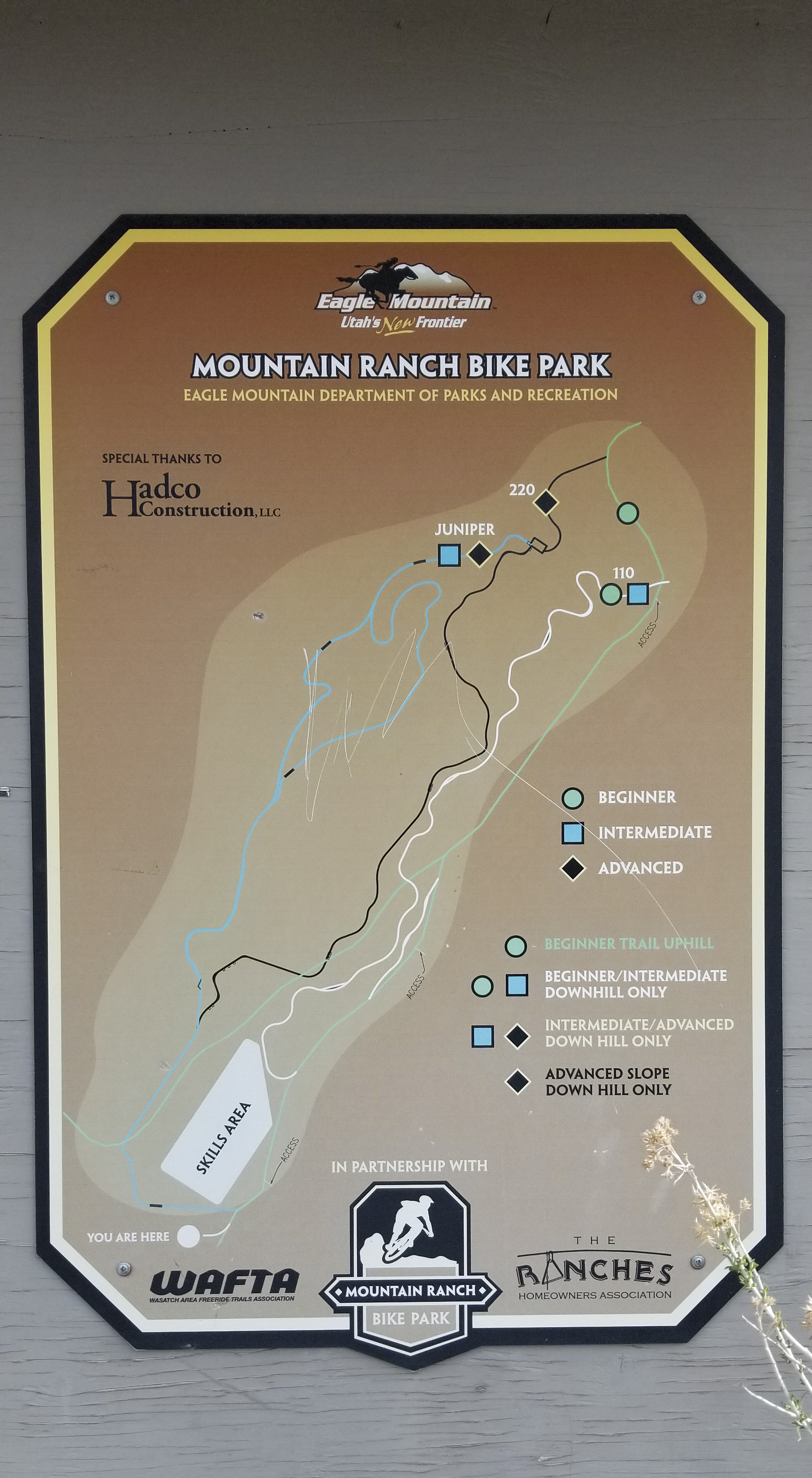
