= Beck's Saratoga Springs =

Resort in Utah, United States

Coordinates: 40.3491°N 111.9049°W

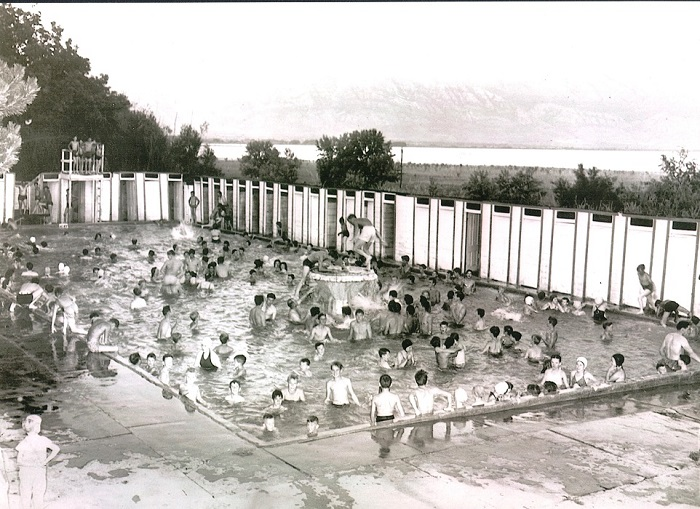
A photo of the Hot Spring pool, around the 1940s.

Beck's Saratoga Springs, also known as Beck's Saratoga Hot Springs or Saratoga Resort, was a resort on Utah Lake that operated from 1882 to 1993. The resort was located on the north shore of Utah Lake in what is now Saratoga Springs, Utah.

== Geography ==
The Saratoga Hot Springs is a geological hot springs formation likely created by geothermal activity. It is located on the north-west shore of Utah Lake. The temperature varies but is typically around 110° Fahrenheit.

== History ==
The history of Beck's Saratoga Springs dates back to 1860, when a man named John Conrad Naile from the then small town of Lehi purchased the land surrounding the warm springs. He planted a large apple orchard which he irrigated with the springs. The land was soon sold to John Beck, a rich mining entrepreneur who soon began to see the potential in developing the land as a resort. He and other settlers used the wealth from Beck's Bullion Beck Mine in Eureka and first established the resort in 1884, with the first building going up around 1885. Beck's name and idea for the resort came from the famous Saratoga Springs, New York resort by the same name. By the 1890s, the resort was well established. An advertisement published in the Lehi Banner noted that for twenty-five cents one could bathe in two large plunge baths and six hot tub baths. The ad further claimed that "these springs possess wonderful medicinal properties for rheumatism and disease of the skin... a plunge in these health-giving waters will cure 'That Tired Feeling.'"

After a bridge and road from Lehi was built to the resort, tourism increased dramatically. The resort had its ownership transferred multiple times, eventually resting in the hands of the Lehi Sugar Company and the Austin brothers. The resort received ferry, taxi, automobile, and many other forms of transportation to and from its shores. The resort went on to expand for over a hundred years, adding in a wide variety of attractions. Some of these attractions included a dance floor, dance hall, bath houses, a baseball field, indoor pools, an arcade, food stands, a restaurant, amusement rides, and even a 350 foot water slide nicknamed "The Kamikaze".

In 1968, Saratoga suffered a large fire that burned the dance pavilion and main building. The damages were between $50,000 and $100,000, and although there was a minor explosion caused by a chlorine tank, no one was injured.

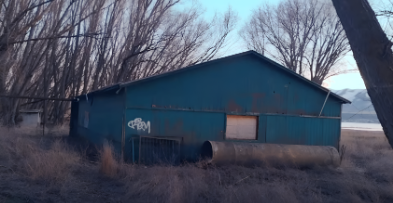
An abandoned building near the likely spot of the Beck's Resort campground.

Eventually, due to factors such as flooding damage from Utah Lake and waning popularity, the resort was dismantled in the year 1995. The remaining structures were soon torn down, with the land being sold to developers, becoming the foundation of what is now Saratoga Springs, Utah.

Today, little to nothing remains of the resort itself, however, the hot springs remain a minor tourist attraction. Some remnants of the campground are still present on the lake shore, but the namesake of Saratoga Springs continues to be the most prominent example of what is left of the resort.

== See also ==
- Saratoga Springs, Utah
- Saratoga Springs, New York
- Eureka, Utah
