= Eagle Mountain, Utah =

City in Utah, United States

- City
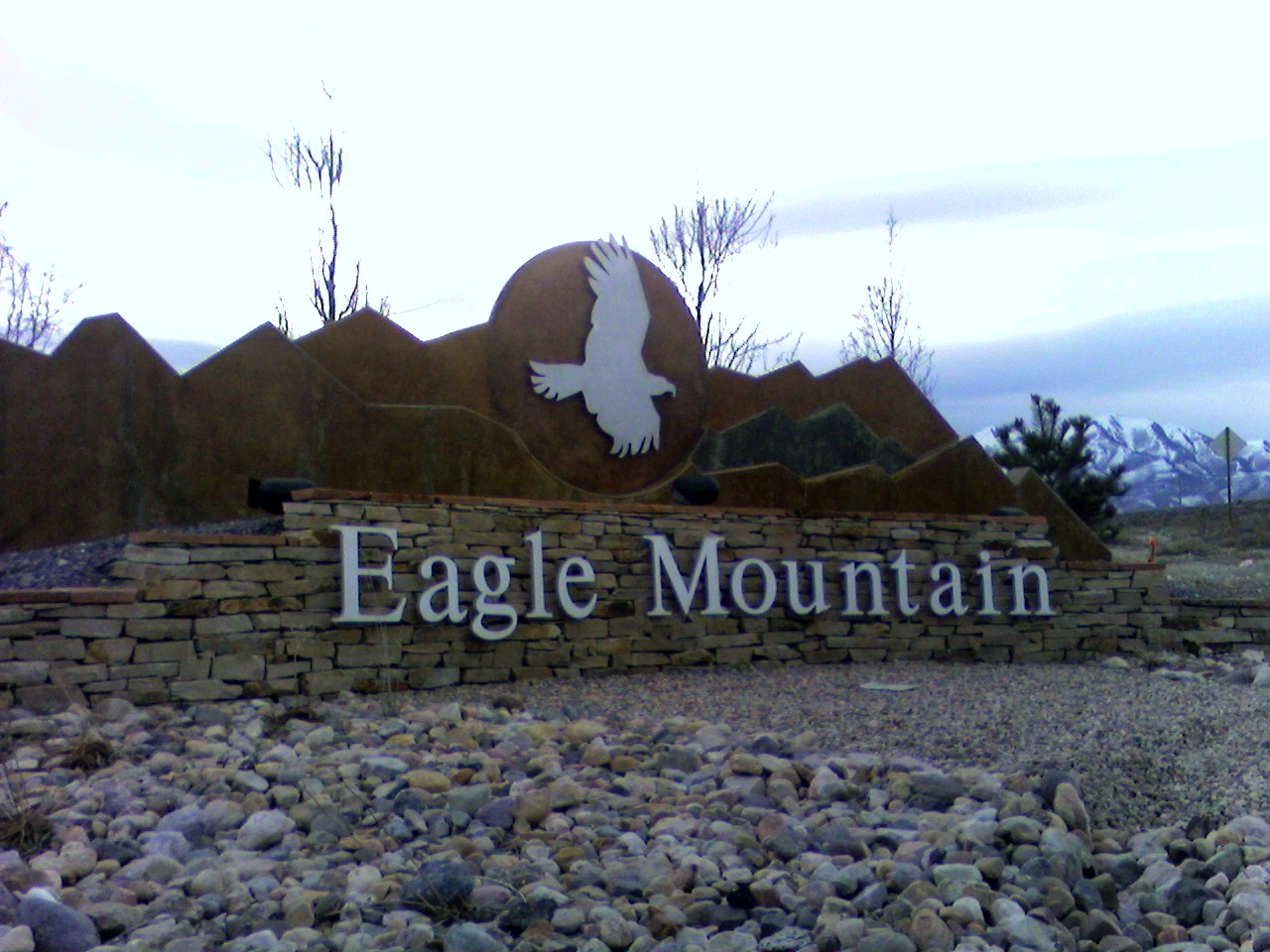
- Eagle Mountain monument

- Location in Utah County and the state of Utah
- Coordinates: 40°18′52″N 112°02′35″W
- Country: United States
- State: Utah
- County: Utah
- Incorporated: December 3, 1996
- Became a city: May 31, 2001

Government
  - Type: Six Member Council

Area
  - Total: 50.43 sq mi (130.61 km^{2})
  - Land: 50.43 sq mi (130.61 km^{2})
- Elevation: 4,885 ft (1,489 m)

Population (2020)
  - Total: 43,623
  - Estimate (2025): 66,557
  - Density: 865.0/sq mi (333.99/km^{2})
- Time zone: UTC-7 (Mountain (MST))
  - Summer (DST): UTC-6 (MDT)
- ZIP code: 84005
- Area codes: 385, 801
- FIPS code: 49-20810
- GNIS feature ID: 2410380
- Website: eaglemountain.gov

Eagle Mountain is a city in Utah County, Utah, United States. It is part of the Provo–Orem metropolitan area, and located to the west and north of the Lake Mountains.

The city was incorporated in December 1996 and reached a population of 43,623 by the 2020 Census, increasing to an estimated 66,557 by 2025, cementing its reputation as one of the fastest-growing communities in the state’s recent history.

== History ==
=== Founding ===
In 1994, a trio of men bought about 8,000 acres (3,200 ha) in the Cedar Valley of western Utah County at a bankruptcy auction, under the company names of "TI Mortgage" and "Monte Vista Ranch". These investors were John Walden, a real estate developer from Florida, and physicians Scott Gettings and Andrew Zorbis. They approached developer Debbie Hooge for help. Already familiar with the area and a resident of the region, Hooge and the trio of investors approached two established communities nearby. The first was Cedar Pass Ranch, a community of large lots; while the second was Harvest Haven, a Fundamentalist Mormon polygamous community on the north side of Utah State Route 73.

The two small communities signed on to the proposal and the town, at 24 square miles, incorporated in December 1996 as the Town of Eagle Mountain. Debbie Hooge was appointed as the First Mayor of the Town of Eagle Mountain. In 2001, the city was reclassified and renamed to Eagle Mountain City. In 2011, Eagle Mountain extended further west with the annexation of the White Hills neighborhood, which had about 400 residents, as well as an area that is part of the Pole Canyon development plan. The land outside of White Hills was almost 2,900 acres.

Eagle Mountain was reclassified as a third-class city on September 4, 2001. Based on current Utah code a municipality achieves "third-class” city status with a population of 30,000 or more but less than 65,000.

=== Landmarks ===
The area is home to several natural and manmade landmarks, including a site along the original Pony Express trail, and a boulder with 1,800-year-old rock art petroglyphs carved by ancient Fremont Indians.

== Geography ==
Eagle Mountain is located at the western and northern bases of the Lake Mountains, in the flat Cedar Valley, east and northeast of the town of Cedar Fort. According to the United States Census Bureau, the city has a total area of 50.3 square miles (130.3 km^{2}), all land.

=== Climate ===
Eagle Mountain's climate varies drastically between the northeastern Ranches area and the southwestern City Center area. Despite being further south than Salt Lake City, both areas have cooler temperatures, due to sitting at a higher elevation. The Ranches section of the city has slightly milder temperatures, since it is closer to the moderating impact of the Salt Lake and Utah Valleys, as well as the Great Salt Lake, which gives it a climate more similar to Salt Lake City.

The City Center area near Fairfield lies in the Cedar Valley, which cuts that area off from the moderating influence of the Salt Lake Valley and Great Salt lake. This causes nights to get significantly colder than in the Ranches, and puts it in a rain shadow, causing less precipitation and more sunshine than the Ranches part of the city.

Within the Köppen climate classification, the climate of the Ranches area is classified as humid subtropical (Cfa) or hot-summer humid continental (Dfa) depending on which variant of the system is used. The City Center area is drier and cooler. The Köppen classification for this area is cold semi-arid (BSk), although rainfall is nearly enough to classify the area as warm-summer humid continental (Dfb).

Climate data for Eagle Mountain (Ranches), Utah (1980-2010 Averages)
Month	Jan	Feb	Mar	Apr	May	Jun	Jul	Aug	Sep	Oct	Nov	Dec	Year
Mean daily maximum °F (°C)	37.1 (2.8)	41.9 (5.5)	52.5 (11.4)	61.1 (16.2)	71.0 (21.7)	82.0 (27.8)	90.7 (32.6)	89.0 (31.7)	78.2 (25.7)	63.6 (17.6)	49.3 (9.6)	38.6 (3.7)	62.9 (17.2)
Mean daily minimum °F (°C)	18.9 (−7.3)	22.4 (−5.3)	30.3 (−0.9)	36.3 (2.4)	45.2 (7.3)	54.3 (12.4)	62.5 (16.9)	61.5 (16.4)	51.5 (10.8)	39.2 (4.0)	28.9 (−1.7)	20.6 (−6.3)	39.3 (4.1)
Average precipitation inches (mm)	1.0 (25)	1.1 (28)	1.8 (46)	1.9 (48)	2.2 (56)	1.0 (25)	1.0 (25)	0.9 (23)	1.4 (36)	1.6 (41)	1.6 (41)	1.3 (33)	16.75 (425)
Average snowfall inches (cm)	8.0 (20)	7.0 (18)	3.9 (9.9)	2.8 (7.1)	0.2 (0.51)	0.0 (0.0)	0.0 (0.0)	0.0 (0.0)	0.0 (0.0)	0.7 (1.8)	4.2 (11)	8.8 (22)	35.48 (90.1)

Climate data for Fairfield (near Eagle Mountain City Center), Utah (1950-2005 Averages)
Month	Jan	Feb	Mar	Apr	May	Jun	Jul	Aug	Sep	Oct	Nov	Dec	Year
Mean daily maximum °F (°C)	38.6 (3.7)	43.6 (6.4)	53.0 (11.7)	62.2 (16.8)	71.8 (22.1)	81.7 (27.6)	89.3 (31.8)	87.7 (30.9)	79.3 (26.3)	66.7 (19.3)	50.6 (10.3)	39.7 (4.3)	63.7 (17.6)
Mean daily minimum °F (°C)	12.4 (−10.9)	16.9 (−8.4)	24.0 (−4.4)	29.6 (−1.3)	36.9 (2.7)	43.9 (6.6)	50.7 (10.4)	49.4 (9.7)	39.7 (4.3)	29.0 (−1.7)	20.3 (−6.5)	13.2 (−10.4)	30.5 (−0.8)
Average precipitation inches (mm)	1.04 (26)	0.99 (25)	1.11 (28)	1.06 (27)	1.21 (31)	0.73 (19)	0.94 (24)	0.99 (25)	0.92 (23)	1.09 (28)	0.95 (24)	0.93 (24)	11.95 (304)
Average snowfall inches (cm)	9.2 (23)	6.5 (17)	4.6 (12)	1.9 (4.8)	0.3 (0.76)	0.0 (0.0)	0.0 (0.0)	0.0 (0.0)	0.0 (0.0)	0.9 (2.3)	4.3 (11)	8.0 (20)	35.9 (91)

Climate data for Eagle Mountain, Utah (combined averages)
Month	Jan	Feb	Mar	Apr	May	Jun	Jul	Aug	Sep	Oct	Nov	Dec	Year
Mean daily maximum °F (°C)	37.9 (3.3)	42.7 (5.9)	52.8 (11.6)	61.6 (16.4)	71.4 (21.9)	81.9 (27.7)	90.0 (32.2)	88.3 (31.3)	78.8 (26.0)	65.1 (18.4)	50.0 (10.0)	39.1 (3.9)	63.3 (17.4)
Mean daily minimum °F (°C)	15.7 (−9.1)	19.6 (−6.9)	27.2 (−2.7)	32.9 (0.5)	41.1 (5.1)	49.1 (9.5)	56.6 (13.7)	55.4 (13.0)	45.6 (7.6)	34.1 (1.2)	24.6 (−4.1)	16.9 (−8.4)	34.9 (1.6)
Average precipitation inches (mm)	1.02 (26)	1.05 (27)	1.40 (36)	1.48 (38)	1.71 (43)	0.86 (22)	0.97 (25)	0.95 (24)	1.16 (29)	1.34 (34)	1.28 (33)	1.11 (28)	14.33 (364)

== Demographics ==
Historical population
Census	Pop.	Note	%±
2000	2,157		—
2010	21,415		892.8%
2020	43,623		103.7%
2025 (est.)	66,557		52.6%

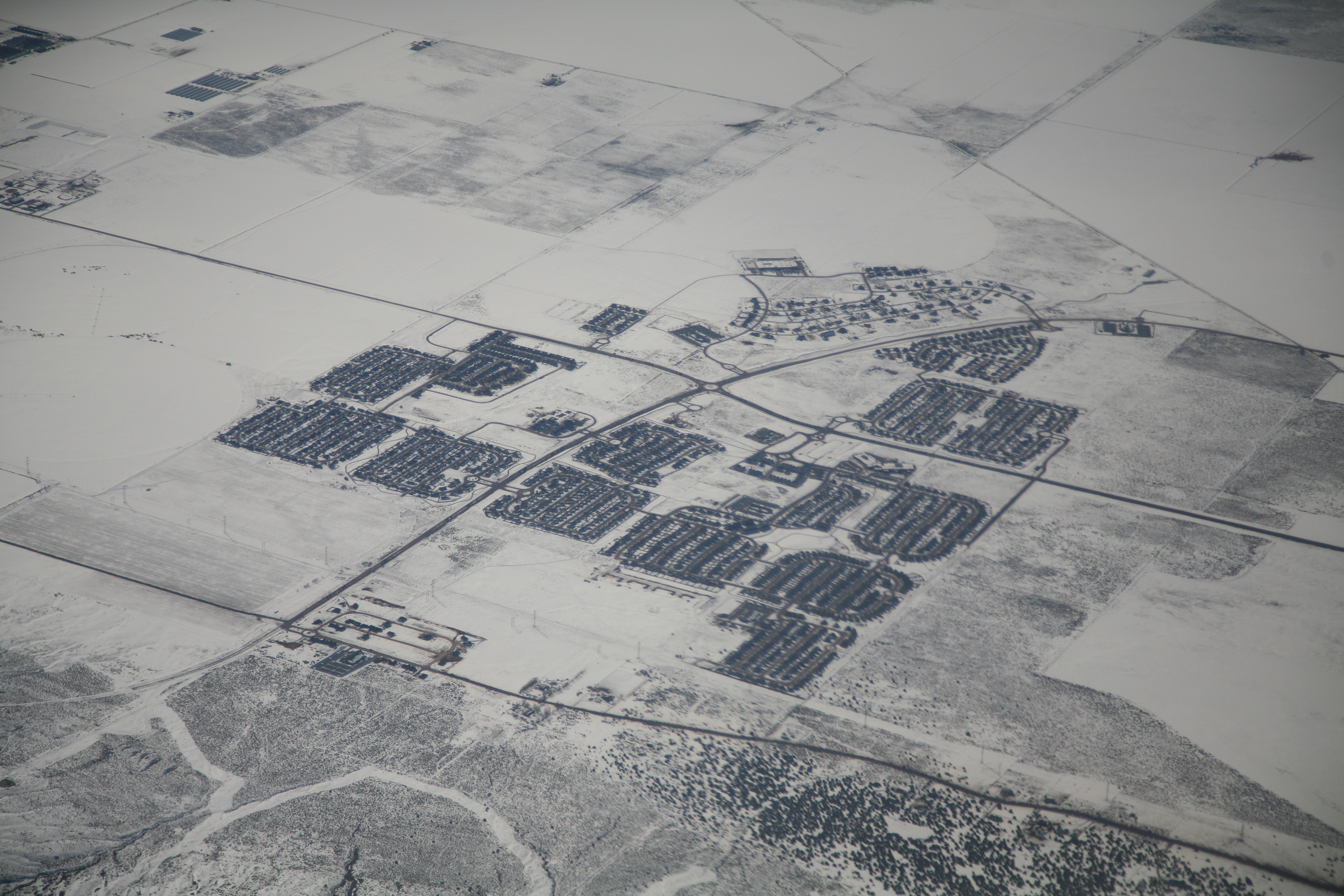
Eagle Mountain from the air, winter 2016

=== 2020 census ===
As of the 2020 census, Eagle Mountain had a population of 43,623. The median age was 22.4 years. 44.7% of residents were under the age of 18 and 3.0% of residents were 65 years of age or older. For every 100 females there were 101.0 males, and for every 100 females age 18 and over there were 99.4 males age 18 and over.

91.6% of residents lived in urban areas, while 8.4% lived in rural areas.

There were 10,350 households in Eagle Mountain, of which 71.9% had children under the age of 18 living in them. Of all households, 79.8% were married-couple households, 7.5% were households with a male householder and no spouse or partner present, and 9.2% were households with a female householder and no spouse or partner present. About 5.5% of all households were made up of individuals and 1.3% had someone living alone who was 65 years of age or older.

There were 10,539 housing units, of which 1.8% were vacant. The homeowner vacancy rate was 0.7% and the rental vacancy rate was 4.1%.

Racial composition as of the 2020 census
Race	Number	Percent
White	36,605	83.9%
Black or African American	299	0.7%
American Indian and Alaska Native	206	0.5%
Asian	363	0.8%
Native Hawaiian and Other Pacific Islander	430	1.0%
Some other race	1,721	3.9%
Two or more races	3,999	9.2%
Hispanic or Latino (of any race)	5,000	11.5%

=== 2010 census ===
As of the 2010 census, there were 21,415 people, 5,111 households, and 4,741 families residing in the town. The population density was 513.6 inhabitants per square mile (20.0/km^{2}). There were 5,546 housing units, at an average density of 133 people per square mile. The racial makeup of the town was 91.9% White, 0.6% African American, 0.5% American Indian and Alaskan Native, 0.6% Asian, 0.6% Pacific Islander, 2.7% from other races, and 3.1% from two or more races. Hispanic or Latino of any race were 8.6% of the population.

In 2010, there were 5,111 households, of which 72.9% had children under 18 living with them, 84.7% were married couples living together, 5.6% had a female householder with no husband present, and 7.2% were non-families. 5.0% of all households were made up of individuals. 0.3% had someone living alone who was 65 years of age or older. The average household size was 4.19. The average family size was 4.34.

In 2010, 49.5% of the population were aged under 18. 4.6% were aged from 20 to 24, 35.7% from 25 to 44, 8.0% from 45 to 64, and 1.8% were aged 65 years of age or older. The median age was 20.3 years.

=== Economic data ===
In the U.S. Census Bureau's 2007-2011 statistics, the median household income was $64,676. The 2007-2011 per capita income for the town was $17,814. About 7.6% of the population was below the poverty line.

=== Politics ===
In 2015, Eagle Mountain was the 10th most conservative city in the United States, as judged by political donations.

== Parks and recreation ==
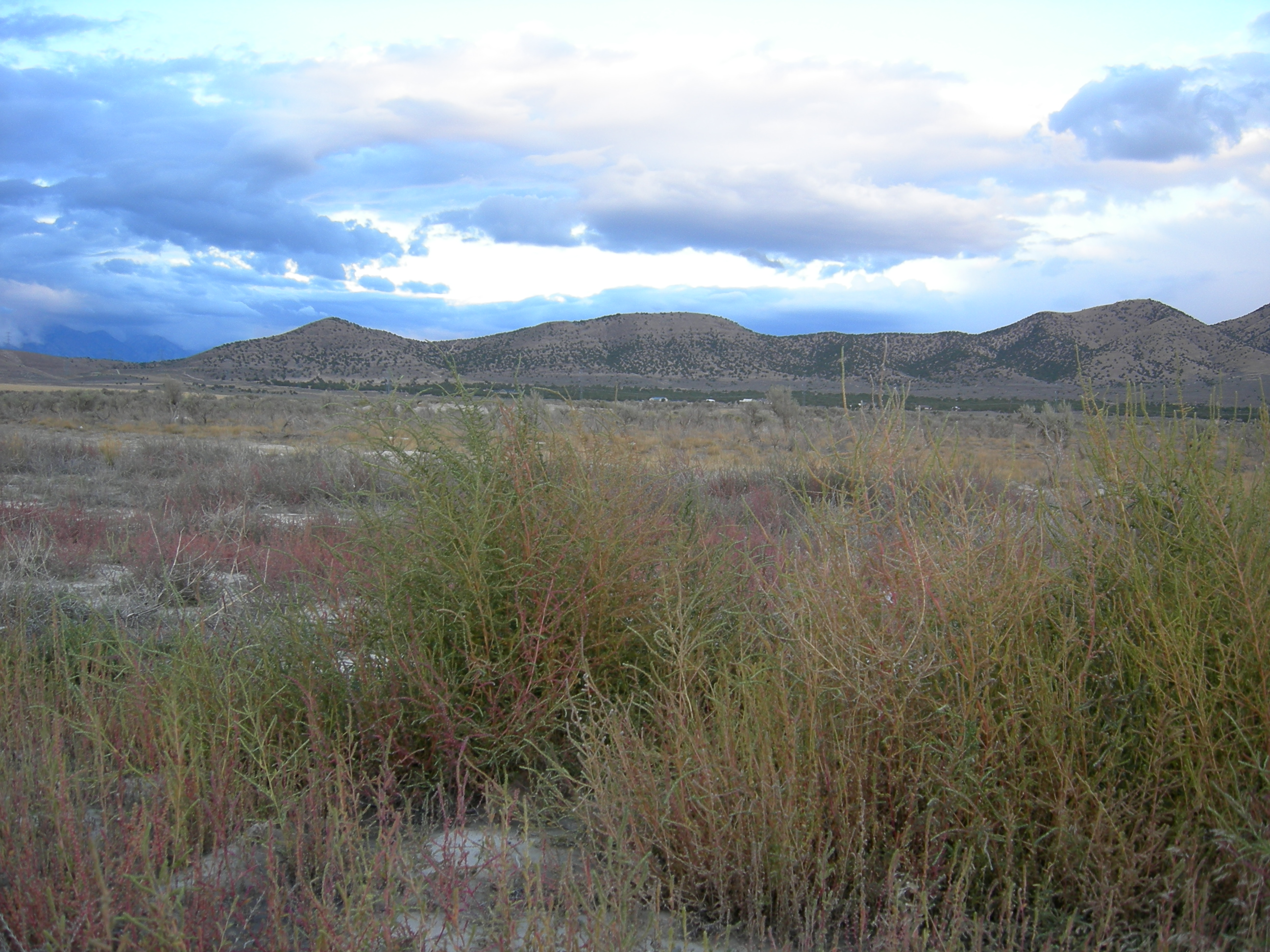
Undeveloped land near the center of the Eagle Mountain

The city lists four regional parks and about 35 local parks. Eagle Mountain City parks are identified on the city's Parks Finder Map. In 2009, Eagle Mountain opened the Mountain Ranch Bike Park. This park is the first of its kind on the Wasatch Front. It features a jump line, two slopestyle tracks, a single track network, and a skills area with a pump track and wood features.

In January 2015 the city council approved budget for expanding Cory B. Wride Memorial park.

== Government ==
Eagle Mountain City has a six-member, Traditional Council form of government. The mayor is a non-voting member of the Council, except in the situation of a tie vote. The mayor acts as an elected executive, with the city council functioning with legislative powers. Eagle Mountain, by ordinance, offers candidates for mayor the option of declaring candidacy as the primary source of income at $70,000 per year, or a secondary source of income at $27,700.

The mayor may select a chief administrative officer to oversee the different departments. The current mayor is Tom Westmoreland who took office in January 2018. Eagle Mountain City has seen a voting history from 3% (2014) of registered voter to 95% (1997) of registered voters participating in an election over the course of its incorporation.

== Education ==
Eagle Mountain is located in the Alpine School District, which is scheduled to split in 2027 after which Eagle Mountain will be part of the newly-formed Lake Mountain School District. Shane J. Farnsworth, Ph.D is the superintendent of Alpine School District as of 2024.

The city has eight elementary schools, Eagle Valley, Hidden Hollow, Mountain Trails, Pony Express, Blackridge, Brookhaven, Silver Lake, and Desert Sky. Frontier Middle School serves students in grades 7–8, except those in the Silverlake area, who attend Vista Heights Middle School in Saratoga Springs. Cedar Valley High School opened in August 2019. Some students in the Silverlake area of Eagle Mountain attend Westlake High School in the adjacent city of Saratoga Springs.

The city has three public charter schools: The Ranches Academy, John Hancock Charter School, and Rockwell Charter High School.

== Infrastructure ==
=== Transportation ===
The six major roads running into Eagle Mountain include SR-73, which runs through the northern part of the city and along its western edge into Cedar Fort. Eagle Mountain Blvd goes straight to the city center. Ranches Pkwy provides access to the Ranches from SR-73. Aviator Ave runs from Eagle Mountain Blvd to Pony Express Pkwy, by the new Cedar Valley High School. Pole Canyon Blvd provides access from White Hills to City Center. The Pony Express Pkwy was extended east to Redwood road in Saratoga Springs in 2010. This was done to facilitate access with the rest of Utah County via connection with Pioneer Crossing, the east-west connector from Redwood Road to I-15.

SR-73, Eagle Mountain Boulevard, and Ranches Parkway provide regional access to the city from Salt Lake Valley. Pioneer Crossing, Redwood Road, and Pony Express Parkway provide access to the city from Utah Valley. The city center sits at least 15 miles (24 km) from the two valleys' main transportation corridor along I-15. The Utah Department of Transportation is in the process of building a western freeway for the Salt Lake Valley, the Mountain View Corridor, which will connect to SR-73, only a few miles from the city. The segment of this highway connecting the Salt Lake and Utah Valleys was completed in December 2025.

In 2008, the Utah Transit Authority began service on an express bus route (#806) into Eagle Mountain. It is the first UTA bus to service the city. It runs exclusively on weekday mornings and evenings for commuters.

== Notable people ==
- David Blair, Paralympic discus thrower
- Daniel Burton, computer programmer and bicycle enthusiast
- Tim Ballard, founder of anti-sex trafficking organization Operation Underground Railroad
- Gregg Hale, musician, noted for playing with UK group Spiritualized
- J. LaMoine Jenson, leader of Apostolic United Brethren (2005-2014)
- David Lifferth, former member of the Utah House of Representatives (2013–2017) and interim mayor of Eagle Mountain (2005)
- Noelle Pikus-Pace, retired skeleton racer
- Eric James Stone, author

== See also ==
- List of cities and towns in Utah
