= Pinesdale, Montana =

- Town
- Location of Pinesdale, Montana
- Coordinates: 46°20′02″N 114°13′23″W
- Country: United States
- State: Montana
- County: Ravalli

Area
  - Total: 1.30 sq mi (3.36 km^{2})
  - Land: 1.30 sq mi (3.36 km^{2})
  - Water: 0 sq mi (0.00 km^{2})
- Elevation: 3,960 ft (1,210 m)

Population (2020)
  - Total: 805
  - Density: 620.9/sq mi (239.74/km^{2})
- Time zone: UTC-7 (Mountain (MST))
  - Summer (DST): UTC-6 (MDT)
- ZIP code: 59841
- Area code: 406
- FIPS code: 30-57700
- GNIS feature ID: 2413135

Pinesdale is a town in Ravalli County, Montana, United States. The population was 805 at the 2020 census.

The town was incorporated in 1980. It was settled in the early 1960s by fundamentalist Mormons.

== Geography ==
According to the United States Census Bureau, the town has a total area of 1.30 square miles (3.37 km^{2}), all land.

== Demographics ==
Historical population
Census	Pop.	Note	%±
1990	670		—
2000	742		10.7%
2010	917		23.6%
2020	805		−12.2%
U.S. Decennial Census

=== 2010 census ===
As of the census of 2010, there were 917 people, 178 households, and 163 families living in the town. The population density was 705.4 inhabitants per square mile (272.4/km^{2}). There were 194 housing units at an average density of 149.2 per square mile (57.6/km^{2}). The racial makeup of the town was 97.6% White, 0.3% African American, 0.5% Native American, 1.4% from other races, and 0.1% from two or more races. Hispanic or Latino of any race were 4.7% of the population.

There were 178 households, of which 74.7% had children under the age of 18 living with them, 58.4% were married couples living together, 30.9% had a female householder with no husband present, 2.2% had a male householder with no wife present, and 8.4% were non-families. 8.4% of all households were made up of individuals, and 3.4% had someone living alone who was 65 years of age or older. The average household size was 5.15 and the average family size was 5.44.

The median age in the town was 16.1 years. 55.1% of residents were under the age of 18; 11.5% were between the ages of 18 and 24; 18.6% were from 25 to 44; 10.5% were from 45 to 64; and 4.4% were 65 years of age or older. The gender makeup of the town was 47.5% male and 52.5% female.

=== 2000 census ===
As of the census of 2000, there were 742 people, 139 households, and 128 families living in the town. The population density was 567.0 inhabitants per square mile (218.9/km^{2}). There were 149 housing units at an average density of 113.9 per square mile (44.0/km^{2}). The racial makeup of the town was 97.71% White, 0.13% Native American, and 2.16% from two or more races. Hispanic or Latino of any race were 2.96% of the population.

There were 139 households, out of which 72.7% had children under the age of 18 living with them, 54.0% were married couples living together, 34.5% had a female householder with no husband present, and 7.9% were non-families. 7.9% of all households were made up of individuals, and 3.6% had someone living alone who was 65 years of age or older. The average household size was 5.34 and the average family size was 5.66.

In the town, the population was spread out, with 59.7% under the age of 18, 12.0% from 18 to 24, 15.2% from 25 to 44, 9.3% from 45 to 64, and 3.8% who were 65 years of age or older. The median age was 15 years. For every 100 females there were 93.2 males. For every 100 females age 18 and over, there were 69.9 males.

The median income for a household in the town was $26,528, and the median income for a family was $27,361. Males had a median income of $23,333 versus $17,857 for females. The per capita income for the town was $5,051. About 31.1% of families and 35.2% of the population were below the poverty line, including 40.8% of those under age 18 and 11.1% of those age 65 or over.

== Religion ==
The majority of the residents of Pinesdale are members of the Apostolic United Brethren. The community once included Alex Joseph, who later became the first Libertarian mayor in the United States.
