= Owen A. Allred =

American religious leader (1914–2005)

President of the Priesthood of the Apostolic United Brethren
- May 10, 1977 – February 14, 2005
- Predecessor: Rulon C. Allred
- Successor: J. LaMoine Jenson

Personal details
- Born: Owen Arthur Allred; January 15, 1914; Blackfoot, Idaho, United States
- Died: February 14, 2005 (aged 91); Bluffdale, Utah, US
- Resting place: Taylorsville Memorial Park Cemetery; 40.670°N 111.937°W
- Spouse(s): 8
- Children: 23

Owen Arthur Allred (January 15, 1914 – February 14, 2005) was the leader of the Apostolic United Brethren, a Mormon fundamentalist polygamist group centered in Bluffdale, Utah. He came to this position following the murder of his brother Rulon Allred on orders of rival polygamist leader Ervil LeBaron, in 1977.

== Biography ==
Allred was born in Blackfoot, Idaho. He had eight wives, twenty-three children and over two hundred grandchildren. A letter sent to Allred by LDS President Heber J. Grant dated to 20 October 1937 appears in the relevant presidency letterbooks.

In 1942, he was excommunicated from the Church of Jesus Christ of Latter-day Saints (LDS Church) when he married his second wife. After his death, he was succeeded by J. LaMoine Jensen.

Shortly after Allred became head of the AUB, Spencer W. Kimball, the then-president of the LDS Church announced in 1978 that all worthy males would be able to hold the priesthood without regard to race or color. This effectively ended a century-long prohibition preventing black men from holding priesthood office in the LDS Church. Owen Allred stridently opposed this new practice. He immediately declared that the temples of the LDS Church had been desecrated by the presence of black Latter-day Saints. In response, the AUB built its own Endowment House in Bluffdale and began performing ordinances.

By the late 1990s, the AUB had around 7,200 total members. As prophet of the community, he was one of the ten members of the priesthood council which had strong regulatory power over his followers. The priesthood authority The priesthood was tasked with authorizing marriages, approving "economic stewardships or policy changes", and conducting regular disciplinary actions. It also had financial authority over a number of properties, including ranches, a dairy, a construction company, and even a golf course.

Owen Allred is perhaps best known for his outspoken criticism of child abuse and marriages of girls under the age of 18. He publicly denounced the child abuse that occurred in many polygamist groups and encouraged members of the AUB to report such activities to law enforcement officials. Additionally, he campaigned for the legal marriage age in Utah to be raised from 14 to 16, noting that AUB members are forbidden to engage in any courtship before the age of 17.

In addition, Allred has said that polygamy was not a requirement to be a member of the AUB, and further claimed that only 10–15% of members ever do enter into it.

In 2003, a federal judge ordered Owen Allred to return money that the AUB had received from Virginia Hill. Hill had accused the group of misrepresentation in a business transaction.

Approximately 1300 people attended his funeral.

Apostolic United Brethren titles
Preceded by Rulon C. Allred	President of the Priesthood; May 10, 1977–February 14, 2005	Succeeded by J. LaMoine Jenson
