= Utah Library Association =

Professional association for librarians in Utah

- Nickname: ULA
- Formation: June 8, 1912; 113 years ago
- Parent organization: American Library Association
- Website: ula.org

The Utah Library Association (ULA) is a professional organization for Utah's librarians and library workers. It was founded on June 8, 1912, in Salt Lake City & County Building in Salt Lake City, Utah. The initial founders were Esther Nelson, librarian of the University of Utah; Joanna Sprague and Julie Lynch of the Salt Lake City Public Library; and Howard Driggs, library secretary of the State Board of Public Instruction. Ephraim G. Gowans, Department Chair for Anatomy and Pathology in the University of Utah Medical School, was ULA's first elected president. ULA was initially part of the Utah Education Association and split from them in 1915.

At ULA's first conference in 1913 there were 46 members, by 2012 there were approximately 1,000 on the ULA membership list. For the first 13 years, annual ULA conferences were held in Salt Lake City, in conjunction with the LDS fall conference. ULA has been a charter member of the American Library Association since 1913 and was a founding member of the Mountain Plains Library Association.

ULA advocated for the establishment of the Utah State Library in the 1950s; the library was established with state support, the last state library agency created in the United States up until then.

ULA published Utah Libraries (formerly the ULA Newsletter, est. 1938) from 1957 through 1990.

== See also ==
- List of libraries in the United States
