= Saratoga Springs, Utah =

City in Utah, United States

- City
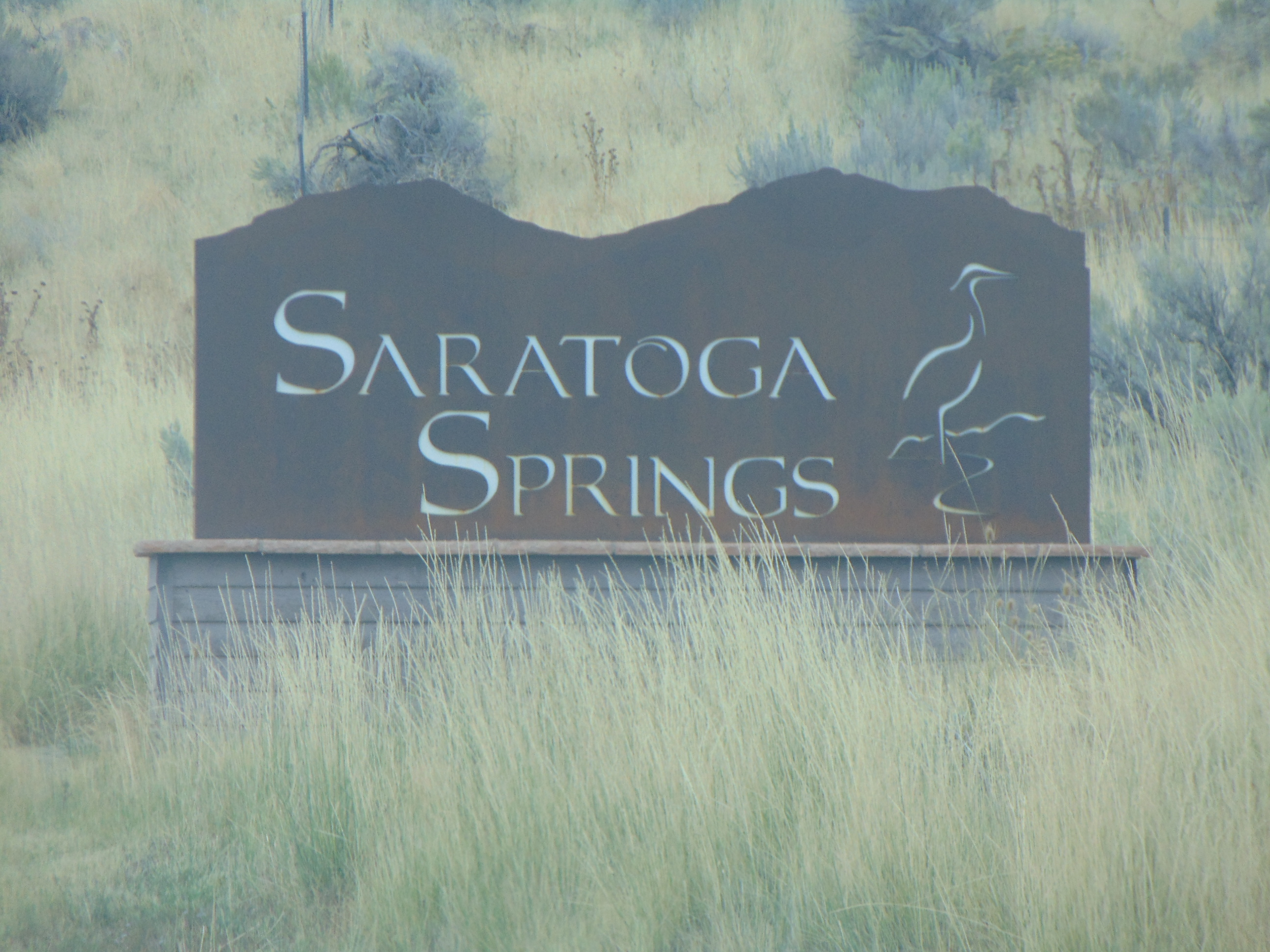
- Saratoga Springs sign

- Location in Utah County and the state of Utah
- Coordinates: 40°20′34″N 111°54′40″W
- Country: United States
- State: Utah
- County: Utah
- Incorporated: December 31, 1997
- Became a city: May 31, 2001
- Named for: Saratoga Springs, New York

Government
  - Type: Manager-by-Ordinance

Area
  - Total: 23.36 sq mi (60.49 km^{2})
  - Land: 23.22 sq mi (60.15 km^{2})
  - Water: 0.13 sq mi (0.34 km^{2})
- Elevation: 4,547 ft (1,386 m)

Population (2020)
  - Total: 57,411
  - Density: 1,623/sq mi (626.7/km^{2})
- Time zone: UTC−7 (Mountain (MST))
  - Summer (DST): UTC−6 (MDT)
- ZIP Code: 84045
- Area codes: 385, 801
- FIPS code: 49-67825
- GNIS feature ID: 2411833
- Website: www.saratogasprings-ut.gov

Saratoga Springs is a city in Utah County, Utah, United States. The elevation is 4,547 feet. It is part of the Provo–Orem, Utah Metropolitan Statistical Area. The city is a relatively new development along the northwestern shores of Utah Lake. It was incorporated on December 31, 1997 and has been growing rapidly since then. The population was 37,696 at the 2020 Census. Saratoga Springs became a city in 2001.

== History ==
The natural hot springs near the source of the Jordan River inspired early European-American settlers to create a resort known as Beck's Saratoga Springs, named after the original New York resort and owner John Beck. The Beck family opened their resort in 1884 and used it as their residence. With several lodge buildings and amusement park facilities, the resort became a popular location for tourists and visitors. The original buildings were taken down. The resort area has now been redeveloped privately, containing an outdoor pool, clubhouse, bowery, and kitchen facility for groups and parties.

In the early 1990s, landowners began to investigate the possibilities of developing the land around the hot springs and in the foothill locations of the nearby Lake Mountains range. The Utah County land development ordinances were not sufficiently urban in nature, so several landowners sought incorporation as a town. Subsequently, Saratoga Springs incorporated in December 1997. Several hundred acres have since been annexed into the City limits and the City now occupies a somewhat narrow strip running north and south between Utah Lake and the Jordan River on the East and the foothills to the west. The City contains over twenty-one square miles and runs from Pelican Point on the west side of Utah Lake over eleven miles north to the Camp Williams US Army facility in the foothills between Utah and Salt Lake Counties.

On April 2, 2017, Thomas S. Monson, then president of the Church of Jesus Christ of Latter-day Saints, announced that a temple of the church would be built in Saratoga Springs. The Saratoga Springs Utah Temple's open house was held April to July 2023, and it was dedicated on August 13, 2023.

On June 28, 2020, a wildfire known as the Knolls Fire forced the evacuation of around 13,000 people from 3,100 homes in Saratoga Springs.

== Geography ==
According to the United States Census Bureau, the city has a total area of 16.61 square miles (43.0 km^{2}), of which 16.51 square miles (42.8 km^{2}) is land and 0.1 square miles (0.26 km^{2}) (1.26%) is water. (This water is mostly Utah Lake.)

== Demographics ==
Historical population
Census	Pop.	Note	%±
2000	1,003		—
2010	17,781		1,672.8%
2020	37,696		112.0%
2025 (est.)	61,397		62.9%
U.S. Decennial Census

=== 2020 census ===
As of the 2020 census, Saratoga Springs had a population of 37,696. The median age was 24.3 years. Of residents, 42.7% were under the age of 18 and 4.5% of residents were 65 years of age or older. For every 100 females there were 102.1 males, and for every 100 females age 18 and over there were 100.0 males age 18 and over.

Of residents, 96.9% lived in urban areas, while 3.1% lived in rural areas.

There were 9,317 households in Saratoga Springs, of which 67.0% had children under the age of 18 living in them. Of all households, 80.0% were married-couple households, 7.6% were households with a male householder and no spouse or partner present, and 10.0% were households with a female householder and no spouse or partner present. About 6.9% of all households were made up of individuals and 1.6% had someone living alone who was 65 years of age or older.

There were 9,531 housing units, of which 2.2% were vacant. The homeowner vacancy rate was 0.9% and the rental vacancy rate was 2.6%.

Racial composition as of the 2020 census
Race	Number	Percent
White	32,045	85.0%
Black or African American	288	0.8%
American Indian and Alaska Native	199	0.5%
Asian	463	1.2%
Native Hawaiian and Other Pacific Islander	375	1.0%
Some other race	1,114	3.0%
Two or more races	3,212	8.5%
Hispanic or Latino (of any race)	3,613	9.6%

=== 2010 census ===
As of the 2010 census Saratoga Springs had a population of 17,781 in 4,387 households and 4,022 families. The racial and ethnic makeup of the population was 89.4% non-Hispanic white, 0.5% African-American, 0.9% Asian, 0.8% Pacific Islander, 0.2% non-Hispanics from some other race, 0.3% Native American, 2.8% from two or more races, and 5.8% Hispanic or Latino, and the median age in 2010 was 21.6.

=== 2000 census ===
As of the census of 2000, there were 1,003 people, 271 households, and 249 families residing in the town. The population density was 98.2 people per square mile (37.9/km^{2}). There were 301 housing units at an average density of 29.5 per square mile (11.4/km^{2}). The racial makeup of the town was 94.72% White, 0.60% black, 0.10% Native American, 1.00% Asian, 0.50% Pacific Islander, 0.90% from other races, and 2.19% from two or more races. Hispanic or Latino of any race were 3.99% of the population.

There were 271 households, out of which 57.6% had children under the age of 18 living with them, 84.1% were married couples living together, 4.4% had a female householder with no husband present, and 8.1% were non-families. Of all households, 6.3% were made up of individuals, and 1.8% had someone living alone who was 65 years of age or older. The average household size was 3.70 and the average family size was 3.88.

In the town the population was spread out, with 38.3% under the age of 18, 10.2% from 18 to 24, 32.9% from 25 to 44, 14.9% from 45 to 64, and 3.8% who were 65 years of age or older. The median age was 26 years. For every 100 females, there were 101.4 males. For every 100 females age 18 and over, there were 99.7 males.

The median income for a household in the town was $62,212, and the median income for a family was $61,923. Males had a median income of $44,464 versus $36,739 for females. The per capita income for the town was $20,304. About 3.8% of families and 2.5% of the population were below the poverty line, including 2.7% of those under age 18 and 17.4% of those age 65 or over.

== Government ==
Saratoga Springs has a manager-by-ordinance form of government. A professional manager is appointed by the City Council to oversee the daily operations of the city.

== Schools ==
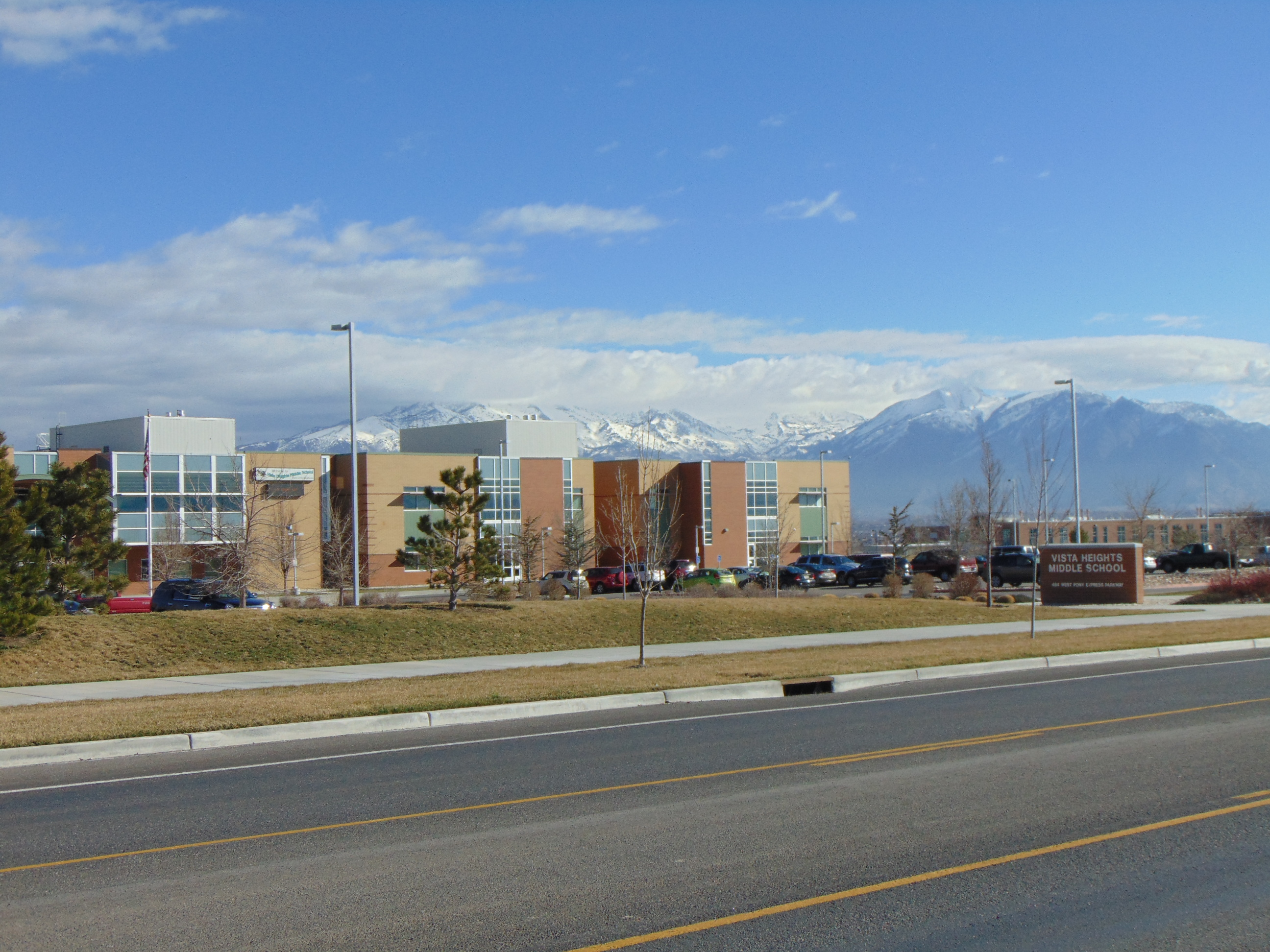
Vista Heights Middle School, March 2016

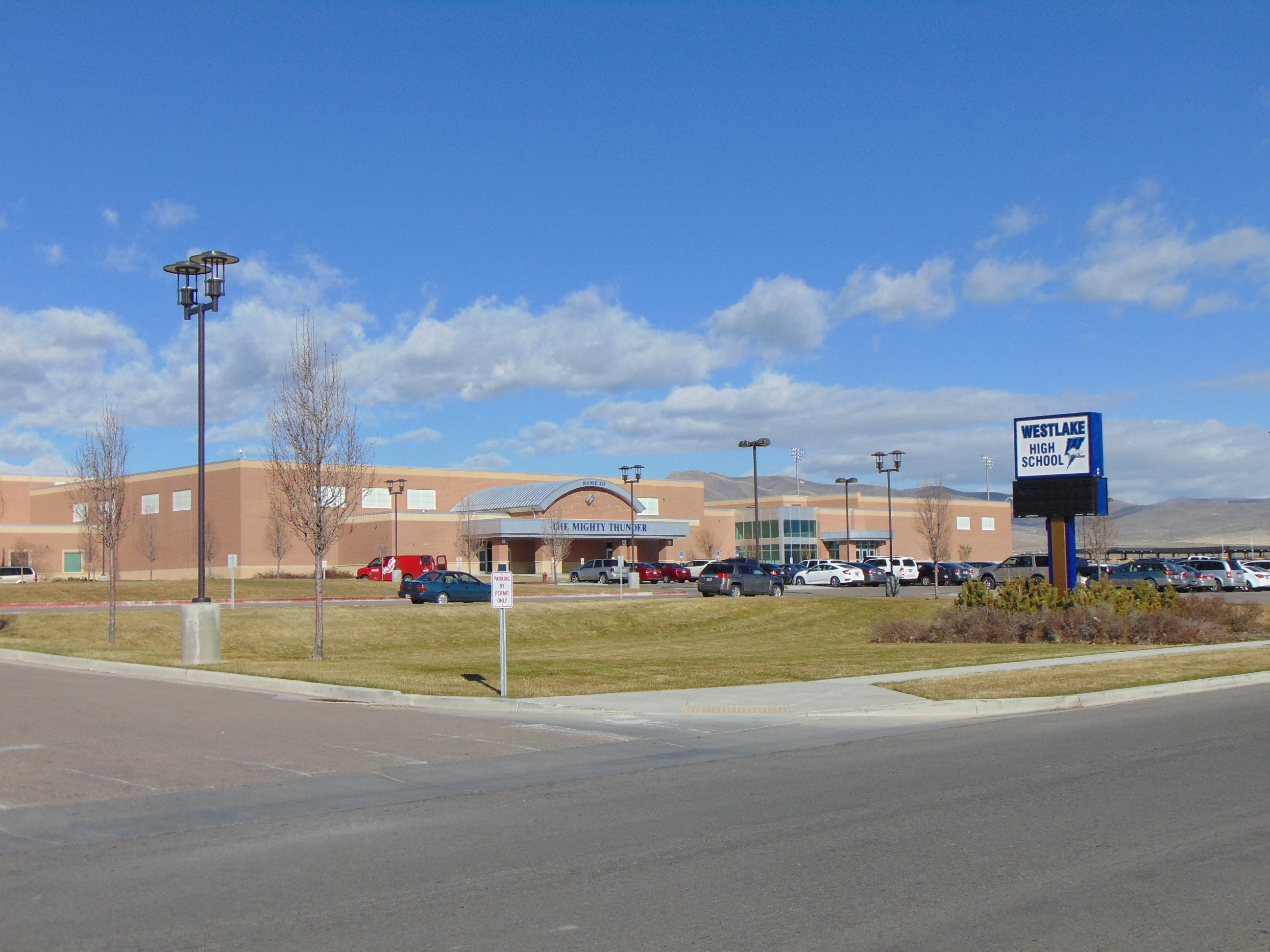
Westlake High School, March 2016

Saratoga Springs is part of the Alpine School District, which covers all of Utah County from Orem northward. Due to rapid population growth since the early 2000s, the school district built several elementary schools in Saratoga Springs, followed by two middle schools and a high school.

=== Elementary schools ===
- Harbor Point Elementary School (autumn 2021)
- Springside Elementary School (autumn 2016)
- Riverview Elementary School (autumn 2011)
- Thunder Ridge Elementary School (autumn 2011)
- Sage Hills Elementary School (autumn 2009)
- Harvest Elementary School (autumn 2006)
- Saratoga Shores Elementary School (autumn 2004)

=== Middle schools ===
- Vista Heights Middle School (autumn 2010)
- Lake Mountain Middle School (autumn 2019)

=== High schools ===
- Westlake High School (autumn 2009)

=== Charter and special schools ===
- Mountain Sunrise Academy K–8 (autumn 2020)
- Lakeview Academy (K–9 charter school; autumn 2006)
- Ascent Academy (K–9 charter school)
- Horizon School (special education for ages 3–22; autumn 2011)
- The New Haven School opened in the city in 1996 as a private in-patient therapeutic school for girls aged 14–18.

== Library ==
Saratoga Springs is one of the few American cities in the 21st century to have started a municipal library with a majority of donations from volunteers. In 2010, the city council authorized $10,000 in seed money to fund the start of a city library. In 2013, the library had grown so popular that the city council recognized the need for a full-time library and authorized it. As of August 2022, the library has over 8,000 cardholders and a collection of more than 24,000 items. The library also provides additional programs for residents including science nights, story times, Wiggle Worms, a literacy center, and test proctoring. On January 1, 2014, the city library began operating under new full-time hours.

== Notable people ==
- Mia Love (1975–2025), former U.S. Representative; first Black female Republican elected to Congress; former mayor of Saratoga Springs.
- Mark B. Madsen (born 1963), attorney and former Utah state senator (2005–2017); longtime resident of Saratoga Springs during his legislative tenure
- Jefferson Moss (born 1976), entrepreneur and state politician who represented Saratoga Springs in the Utah House of Representatives (2017–2025) and served as House Majority Leader
- Jamal Willis (born 1972), former American football running back (Brigham Young University and the San Francisco 49ers); later worked as a school administrator for Alpine School District in Saratoga Springs

== See also ==
- List of cities and towns in Utah
