= Lee Perry (politician) =

American politician (born 1966)

Member of the Utah House of Representatives
- In office January 1, 2011 – December 31, 2020
- Preceded by: Ben Ferry
- Succeeded by: Matthew Gwynn
- Constituency: 2nd district (2011–2013); 29th district (2013–2020)

Personal details
- Born: August 10, 1966 (age 60) Brigham City, Utah
- Party: Republican
- Education: Columbia College
- Profession: Police officer
- Website: leeperryutah.com

Lee B. Perry (born August 10, 1966 in Brigham City, Utah) is an American politician and a former Republican member of the Utah House of Representatives.

== Early life and education ==
Perry was born in Brigham City, Utah, and attended Columbia College, where he received his B.A. in criminal justice administration in 1999. He was also certified as police officer in 1990. He has worked for the Utah Highway Patrol/Department of Public Safety since 1998. He and his wife, Kathlyn, have four children.

In 1984, Perry's older brother Brad Perry was murdered while working at a gas station in Brigham City. At the time of the murder, Brad was 22 and Lee was 17. The case went cold, but in 2005 the killer was identified as Glenn Griffin, who is serving a life sentence for the murder. Lee Perry has cited his brother's murder as part of his inspiration to work in law enforcement.

== Political career ==
Perry was first elected on November 2, 2010.

During the 2016 general legislative session, he served on the Natural Resources, Agriculture, and Environmental Quality Appropriations Subcommittee, as the committee chair of the House Natural Resources, Agriculture, and Environment Committee, and on the House Government Operations Committee.

== Elections ==
- 2014 Perry faced Democratic Party nominee Alan Yorgason in the general election, winning with 5,588 votes (77.82%) to Yorgason's 1,593 (22.18%).
- 2012 Redistricted to District 29, and with incumbent Democratic Representative Janice Fisher redistricted to District 30, Perry and incumbent Representative Brad Galvez, who had been redistricted from District 6, were opponents for the June 26, 2012 Republican primary, which Perry won with 2,387 votes (60.7%); Perry won the November 6, 2012 general election with 11,525 votes (79.8%) against Democratic nominee Heidi Bitton.
- 2010 Perry challenged incumbent Republican Representative Ben Ferry and was chosen by the Republican convention for the November 2, 2010 general election; Perry won with 7,160 votes (80.2%) against Constitution Party candidate Becky Maddox.

== 2016 sponsored legislation ==
Bill Number	Bill Title	Status
HB0020	Lead Acid Battery Disposal Sunset Reauthorization	Governor Signed - 3/18/2016
HB0099	Military Retirement Income Tax Exemption	House/ filed - 3/10/2016
HB0138S01	Consumer Electronic Device Recycling Report Amendments	Governor Signed - 3/22/2016
HB0167S01	Utah Law Enforcement Memorial Special Group License Plate	Governor Signed - 3/18/2016
HB0211	Agricultural Exemption Amendments	Governor Signed - 3/17/2016
HB0257	Water Funding Revisions	House/ filed - 3/10/2016
HB0427	Private Security Amendments	House/ filed - 3/10/2016
HB0450	Avalanche Training and Prevention Amendments	House/ filed - 3/10/2016
HJR020	Joint Resolution Approving Class V Landfill	House/ to Lieutenant Governor - 3/16/2016

Perry passed five of the nine bills he introduced, giving him a 55.6% passage rate. He also floor sponsored six Senate bills during the 2016 legislative session.
