= Utah State Route 129 =

State highway in Utah, United States

State Route 129
- SR 129 highlighted in red

Route information
- Maintained by UDOT
- Length: 7.270 mi (11.700 km)
- Existed: 2014–present

Major junctions
- South end: US 89 on the Lindon–Pleasant Grove line
- SR-114 in Lindon; SR-135 in Pleasant Grove; US 89 on Pleasant Grove–American Fork line
- North end: SR-92 in Highland

Location
- Country: United States
- State: Utah
- Counties: Utah

Highway system
- Utah State Highway System; Interstate; US; State; Minor; Scenic
← SR-128	→ SR-130

State Route 129 (SR-129) is a state highway in northern Utah County, Utah, United States. The route spans (mostly) north-south for 7.27 miles (11.70 km) to connect U.S. Route 89 (US-89) on the Lindon-Pleasant Grove line with SR-92 in Highland. The majority of the route runs along North County Boulevard.

== Route description ==
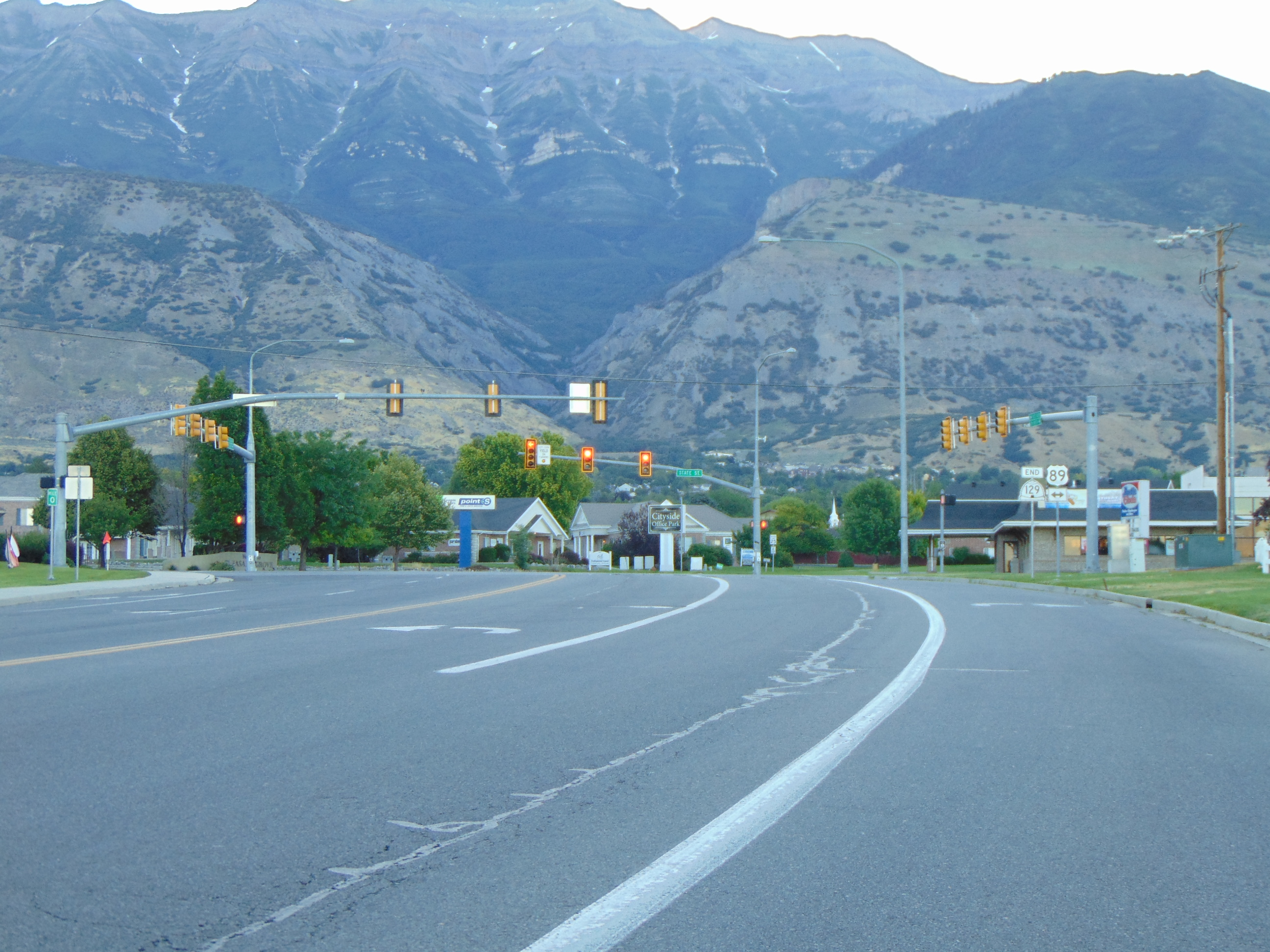
Southern terminus at US 89

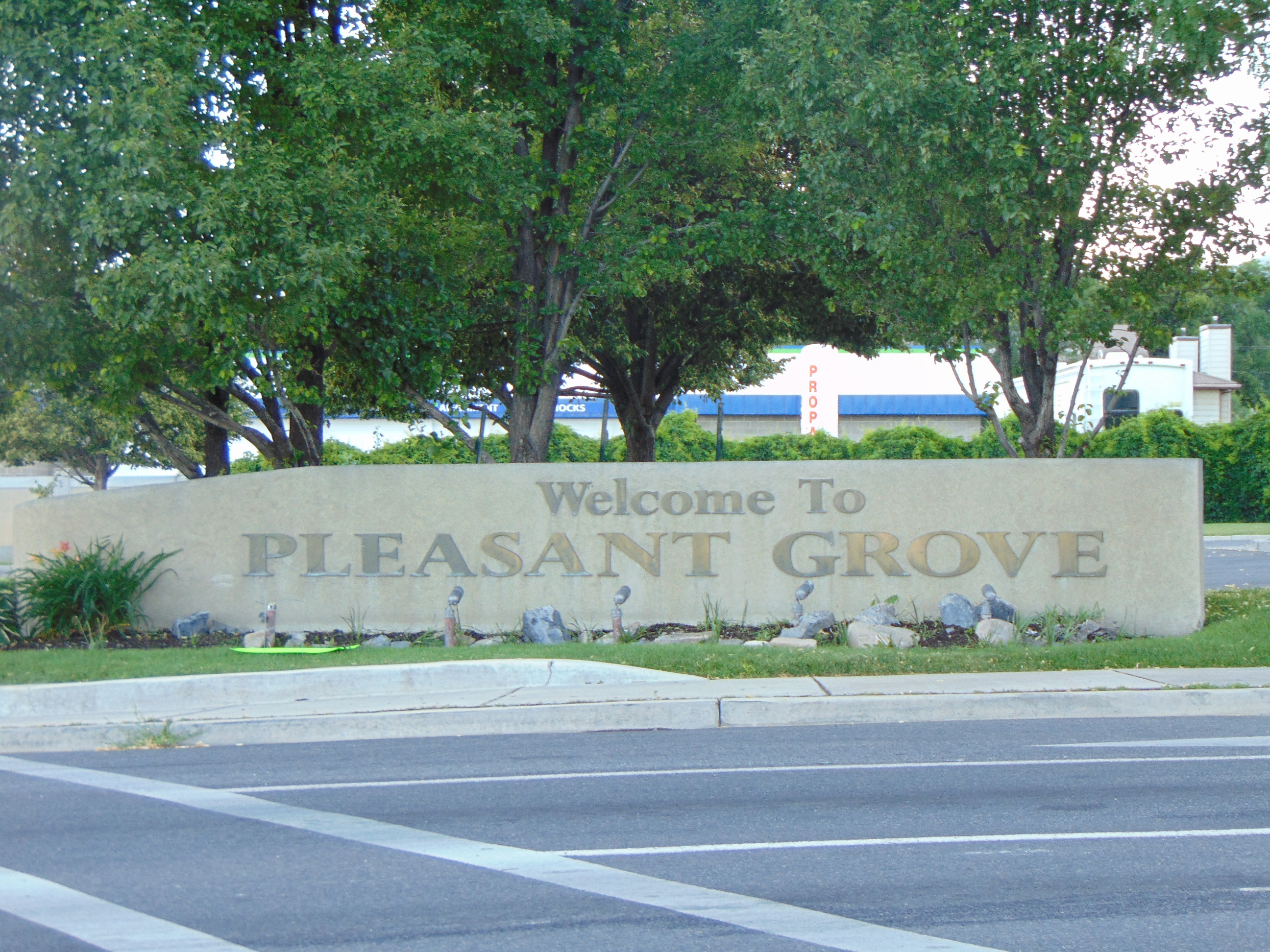
Welcome to Pleasant Grove sign at the southern junction of State Street (US-89) and SR-129, June 2016

SR-129 is a four-lane highway that runs through the northeastern Utah Valley. Much of the route runs through land that was formerly agricultural, but has recently become commercialized.

The route begins at the intersection of State Street (US-89) and 700 North (Lindon)/1000 South (Pleasant Grove) on border of those two cities. (1000 South continues east in Pleasant Grove, but rapidly enters Lindon as 800 North.) From its southern terminus, the route heads west-southwest on 700 North and quickly leaves the business district to enter an industrial area. Just before connecting with the north end of a short section of 800 West, the route curves due west and continues in that direction until it crosses Geneva Road (SR-114). West of North Geneva Road the route continues on to connect with the northern end of 1700 West and then starts curving slightly north. Next it connects with the north end of 2000 West and then crosses the Lindon-Pleasant Grove line at the south end of 1300 West.

Heading northwest in Pleasant Grove, SR-129 crosses Pleasant Grove Boulevard (SR-135), which runs southwest to connect with Interstate 15 (and on to 2800 West in Lindon). After connecting with the northeast end of Grove Parkway, SR-129 continues its curve to the north and becomes North County Boulevard (2000 West). Before completing is curve to the north, the route connects with the west end of 250 South and then continues through residential area. Now heading due north, SR-129 connects with the east end of 390 North before crossing State Street (US-89). North of State Street, the road becomes 1100 East as it runs along the border of American Fork and Pleasant Grove. After crossing Pacific Drive (American Fork)/680 North (Pleasant Grove) and Bamberger Drive (American Fork)/ 800 North (Pleasant Grove) it connects with the west end of 930 North (Pleasant Grove) before reaching 50 South (American Fork)/1100 North (Pleasant Grove).

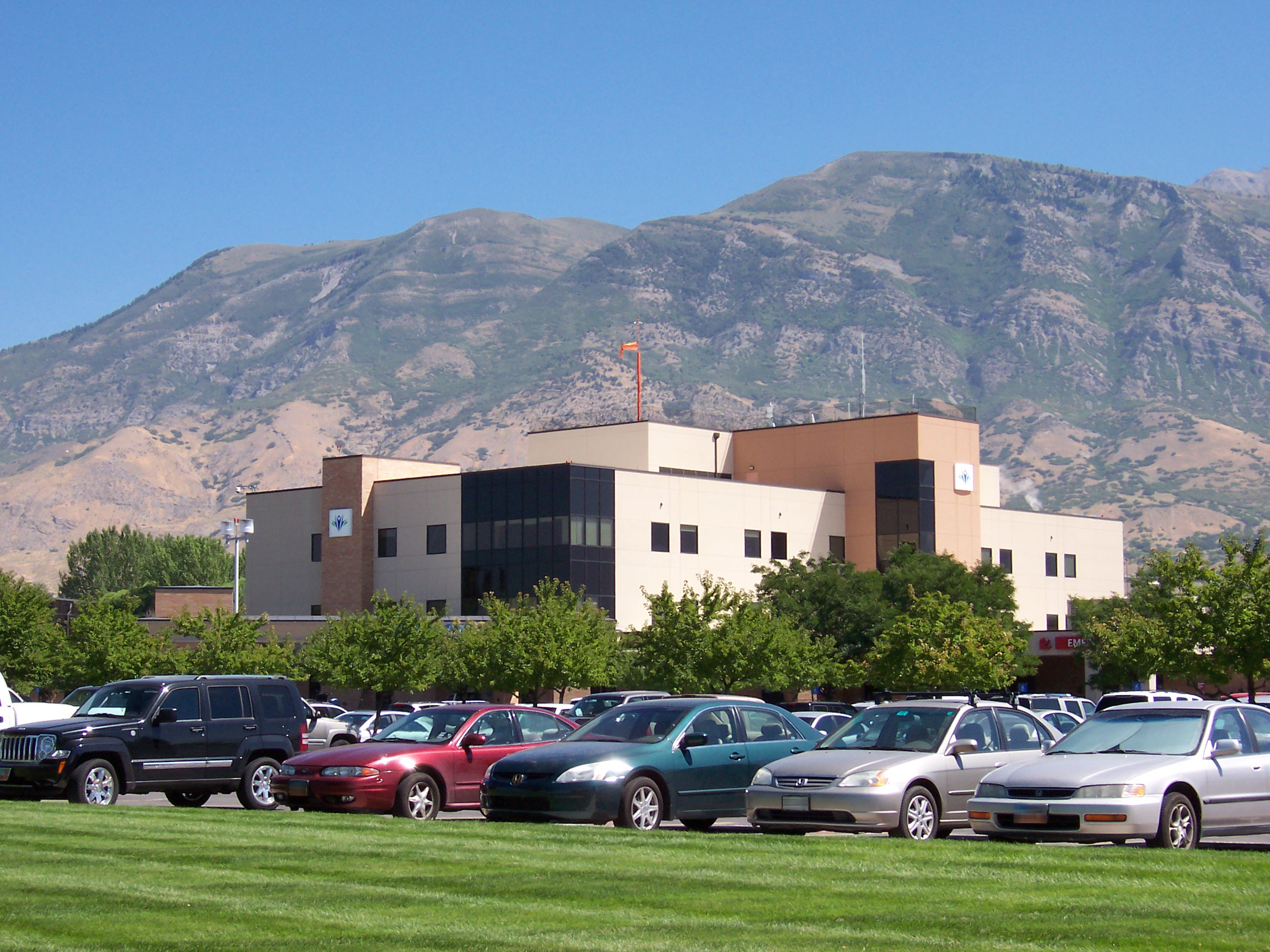
Intermountain Healthcare's American Fork Hospital, with Mahogany Mountain in the background, August 2010

North of that intersection, now entirely within American Fork, SR-129 connects with the east end of 30 North, the west end of 50 North, the east end of 70 North, the west end of 80 North, and the west end of 120 North. It then passes between the Dan Peterson School (on the west) and Intermountain Healthcare's American Fork Hospital (on the east). SR-129 then connects with the west end of 180 North and the east end of 220 North before crossing 300 North. Continuing north the route connects with the east end of 380 North, the west end of 400 North, the east end of 490 North, the west end of 530 North, the east end of 560 North, the west end of 580 North Circle, and the east end of 600 North before crossing 700 North.

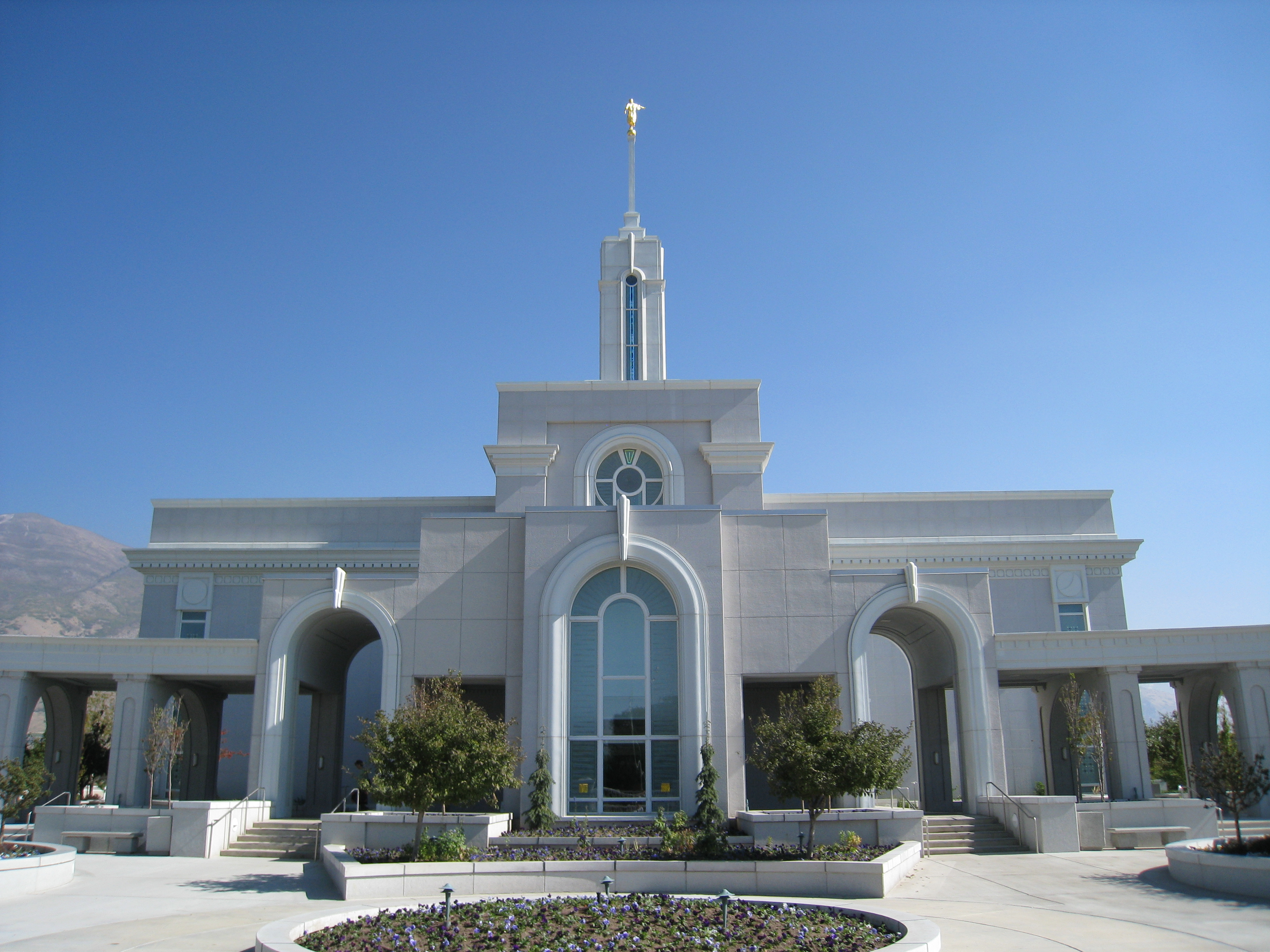
The front of LDS Church's Mount Timpanogos Utah Temple in American Fork, October 2008

North of 700 North, SR-129 passes between the LDS Church's Mount Timpanogos Utah Temple (on the west) and the private American Heritage School (on the east) before curving briefly northwest. After connecting with the west end of 770 North the route crosses 900 East/1000 North and curves back to a due north heading to become 900 East. Passing by the west side of the Utah State Developmental Center, the route connects with the east end of center's primary access, 980 North (as well as the connection to SR-296). SR-129 then connects with the west end of 1100 North, the west end of 1300 North, and the west end of Murdock Drive, before becoming 4800 West as it runs along the Highland-American Fork line.

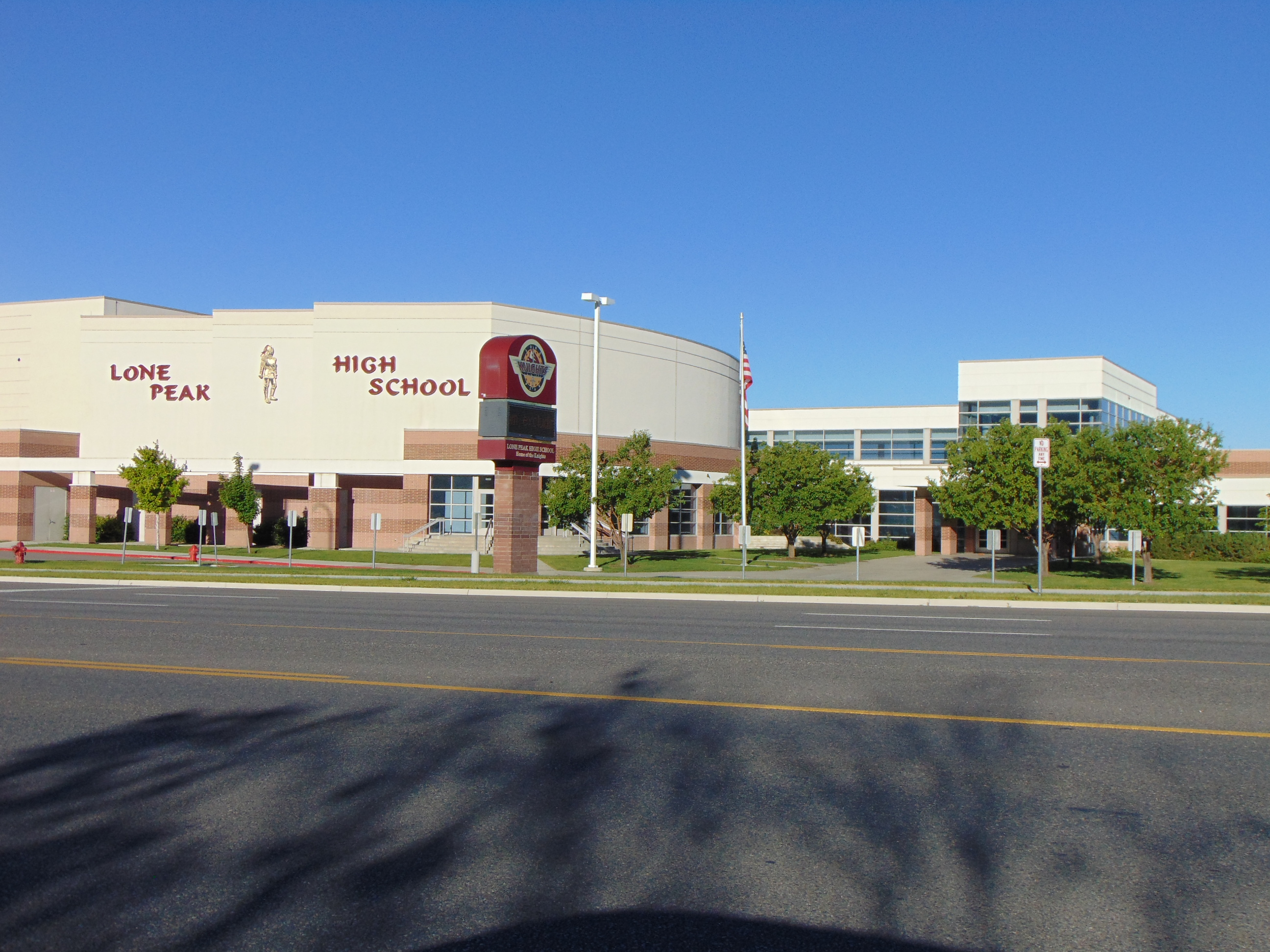
Looking west across SR-129 at Lone Peak High School in Highland, June 2016

Continuing due north, SR-129 connects with the west end of 1520 North Circle before crossing over the Murdock Canal Trail, which runs along the (now buried) Murdock Canal. It then connects with the west ends of Harvey Boulevard, (Note: The west end of Harvey Boulevard at North County Boulevard (SR-129), on the Highland-American Fork line, will be the west end of what is referred to as the Murdock Connector. The Murdock Connector is a planned "east-west" corridor connecting Highland to American Fork between State Route 92 to the north, and 300 North on the south." It will start at the intersection of the Alpine Highway (SR-74) and West 9860 North on the Highland-American Fork line and head east to cross over the American Fork (river) and then jog to the north before continuing east to connect with North County Boulevard (SR-129) at Harvey Boulevard.) 1750 North, and 1800 North, before leaving American Fork and running along the Highland-Cedar Hills line. Just before entirely entering Highland, SR-129 crosses Cedar Hills Drive.

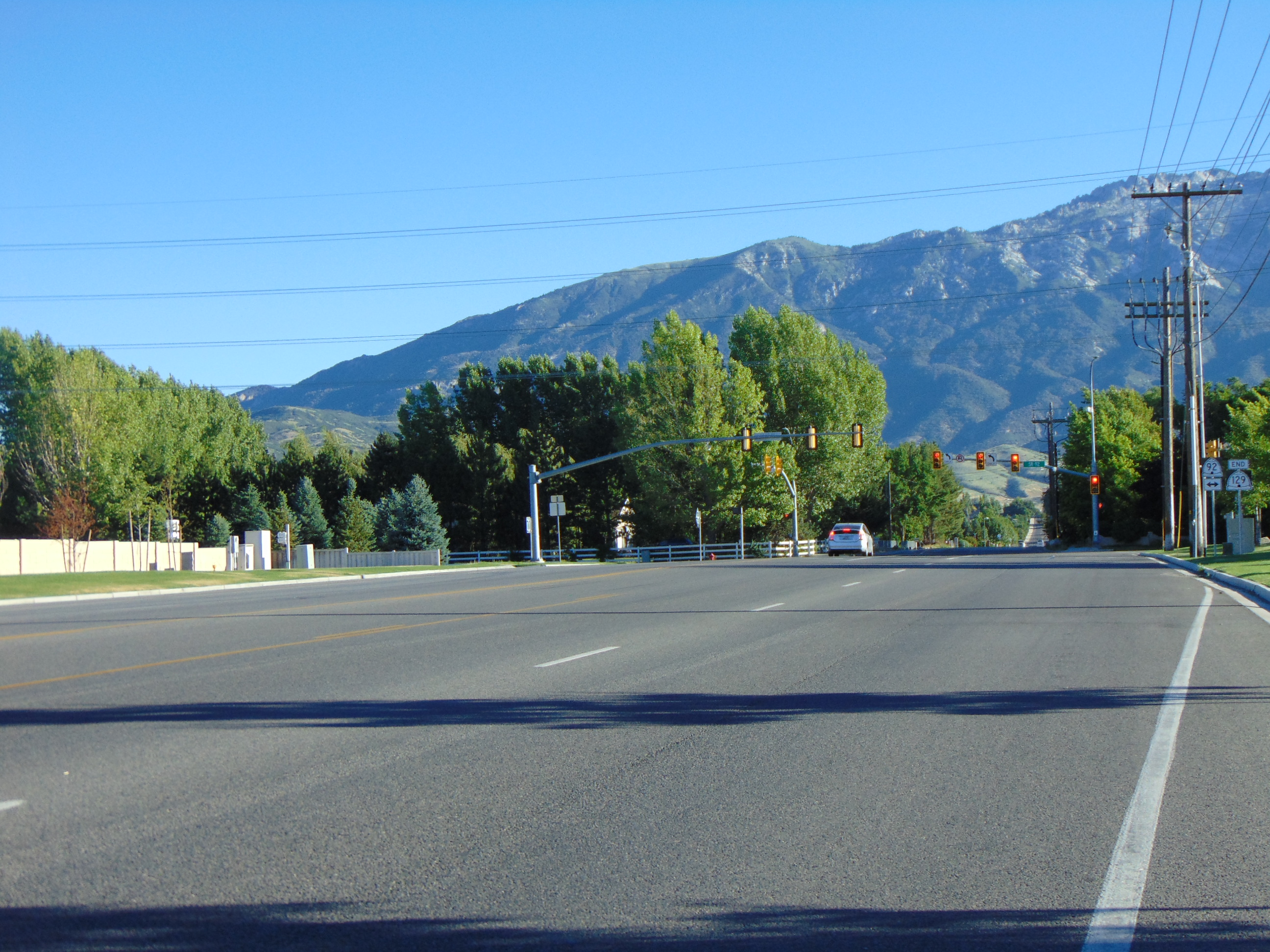
Northern terminus at SR 92

As SR-129 fully enters Highland, it passes by the west side of Lone Peak High School. It then connects with the west ends of 10370 North and Killarney Drive before crossing Knight Drive/Old Bish Lane. After connecting with the west end of Caddie Lane, it crosses over the American Fork (river) and then connects with the west end of Canyon View Drive and Vista Drive. Finally, it crosses Country Club Drive and West Panorama Drive before reaching its northern terminus at the Timpanogos Highway (11000 North/SR-92). (4800 West continues north into Alpine, where it becomes South Canyon Crest Road.

=== Legal definition ===
The legal definition of State Route 129 is as follows:

72-4-118. State highways—SR-121 to SR-130.
(9) SR-129. From Route 89 in Lindon westerly on 700 North; then northerly on North County Boulevard to Route 92 in Highland.

=== Traffic ===
The Utah Department of Transportation (UDOT) collects data for the State Highways and Local Federal-Aid roads. Traffic is measured in both directions and reported Annual Average Daily Traffic (AADT). AADT is collected for major intersections and "sections where traffic volumes show a substantial increase or decrease." The busiest section of SR-129 is between Geneva Road (SR-114) and Pleasant Grove Boulevard (SR-135), with an average of 21,000 vehicles per day. The least busy section of SR-129 is between 700 North and Cedar Hills Drive, with an average of 10,000 vehicles per day. Since 2008, traffic along the busiest section has increased an incredible 2,000 percent and traffic on the least busy section has increased only 8 percent.

In addition to the travel restrictions for oversized vehicles that UDOT has established that apply to all state highways in Utah, SR-129 has additional restrictions which also apply to rush hour travel along most of the Wasatch Front. Specifically, travel by oversized vehicles is restricted on all highways in Utah County north of the North Springville/South Provo Interchange (Exit 361) Monday through Friday from 6:00 am to 9:00 am and from 3:30 pm to 6:00 pm. (Note: The Utah Department of Transportation (UDOT) defines oversized vehicles as any vehicle exceeding any of the following: 10 feet (3.0 m) in width, 105 feet (32 m) in overall length, or 14 feet (4.3 m) in height. Oversized vehicles are prohibited on all state highways in Utah (unless otherwise permitted) during designated and defined major holidays periods (holiday periods exceed the actual day of the holiday). Oversized vehicle are also prohibited Monday through Friday from 6:00 am to 9:00 am and from 3:30 pm to 6:00 pm on all highways within the following areas: All highways in Box Elder County south of the Perry/Willard Interchange (Exit 357) on I-15/I-84, All highways in Davis, Salt Lake, and Weber counties (expressly including all of I-80 in Salt Lake County and all of I-84 in Weber County), and; All highways in Utah County north of the North Springville/South Provo Interchange (Exit 361) on I-15 (including SR-68 north of mile post 16).; In addition, travel by oversized vehicles, plus any with an overhang of more than 10 feet (3.0 m), is restricted to daylight hours.)

== History ==
The original SR-129 was established in 1931 as a road between Moab and Castleton (via Castleton Junction) in southeastern Grand County. However, just a few years later, in 1933, the roadway that ran (mostly along the Colorado River) northeast from Castleton Junction to Cisico was completed. The greater part of SR-129 was then added to SR-128, which continued north-northeast from Castleton Junction along the new road to Cisico The section that ran southeast from Castleton Junction to Castleton was deleted from the state highway system. The original SR-129 was immediately replaced (in 1933) with a road in east-central Beaver County, which was referred to as the loop off SR-21 southeast of Milford. The second SR-129 began on SR-21 about 5.8 miles (9.3 km) south-southeast of Milford and ran due east along East 4500 South (Cates Road) for about 2.1 miles (3.4 km) and then due north for about 4.5 miles (7.2 km) to reconnect with SR-21 in southeast Milford. The second SR-129 was deleted in 1969, along with nearly a hundred other Utah state highways and the SR-129 designation remained unused until 1982. In that year a third SR-129 was established in northeastern Box Elder County. That iteration of SR-129 connected I-15 west of Riverside with SR-30 at Collinston Junction (north of Collinston). Less than a decade later, that section of highway was added to SR-30 and the SR-129 designation again remained unused, this time for 25 years.

By 2014, the third and final phase of North County Boulevard was completed in northeastern Utah County. (The first phase was completed in 2011, the same year second phase began.) While much of the Boulevard was built upon existing roads, the project connected the roads and created a five-lane corridor from the west end of 700 North in Lindon to the Timpanogos Highway (SR-92) in Highland. Once the project was finalized, it was designated, along with an improved 700 North in Lindon, as SR-129. In exchange of mileage, SR-146, a road parallel to SR-129, was cancelled. Since its establishment in 2014, the only significant change along SR-129 has been the designation of Pleasant Grove Boulevard (west of North County Boulevard) as SR-135.

== Major intersections ==
The entire route is in Utah County.

Location	mi	km	Destinations	Notes
Lindon–Pleasant Grove line	0.000	0.000	US 89 (State Street) – Orem, American Fork, Provo	Southern terminus
Lindon	0.474	0.763	SR-114 (Geneva Road) – Pleasant Grove, Orem, Provo	
Pleasant Grove	1.782	2.868	SR-135 (Pleasant Grove Boulevard) – I-15	
American Fork–Pleasant Grove line	2.959	4.762	US 89 (State Street) – American Fork, Pleasant Grove, Lindon	
American Fork	3.849	6.194	300 North – Pleasant Grove	
American Fork	4.453	7.166	700 North – Pleasant Grove	
American Fork			980 North west – To SR-296, Utah State Developmental Center	
Highland–Cedar Hills line	6.143	9.886	Cedar Hills Drive	
Highland	7.270	11.700	SR-92 (Timpanogos Highway) – I-15, American Fork Canyon	Northern terminus
1.000 mi = 1.609 km; 1.000 km = 0.621 mi
