= Utah State Route 92 =

State highway in Utah, United States

State Route 92
- Timpanogos Highway
- SR-92 highlighted in red, with the commuter lane highlighted in blue

Route information
- Maintained by UDOT
- Length: 27.296 mi (43.929 km)
- Existed: 1935 as SR-80; renumbered in 1977–present
- Restrictions: Closed in winter from mile 14 to 22.5

Major junctions
- West end: I-15 / US 89 in Lehi
- SR-74 in Highland; SR-129 in Highland; SR-144 in the Uinta National Forest
- East end: US 189 in Provo Canyon

Location
- Country: United States
- State: Utah

Highway system
- Utah State Highway System; Interstate; US; State; Minor; Scenic
← US 91	→ SR-93

State Route 92 (SR-92), also known in various portions as the Timpanogos Highway, and Alpine Loop Scenic Highway is a scenic state highway in Utah County, Utah that runs from I-15/US-89 in Lehi to US-189 in Provo Canyon. The route is 27.296 miles (43.929 km) long and is the only road with access to Sundance Ski Resort and the Aspen Grove Family Camp and Conference Center.

== Route description ==
The route begins at Ashton Boulevard in northwest Lehi. From its western terminus it heads east through Highland, and up American Fork Canyon, where it enters the Uinta National Forest. Shortly after entering the canyon, it passes the Timpanogos Cave National Monument, a famous group of caves buried in the side of the canyon. The route continues up the canyon, but just before leaving the canyon, it has a junction with the southern end of Utah State Route 144, which heads further north up American Fork Canyon to Tibble Fork Reservoir. SR-92 then bends to the south (with a short bend that extends briefly into Wasatch County) to connect with the west end of the Cascade Scenic Byway (Forest Road 114). After passing the east side of Mount Timpanogos and then the Sundance Resort, the road links up with US-189 in Provo Canyon at Wildwood, just west of the Utah-Wasatch county line and east of the Provo Canyon Tunnels.

The portion of SR-92 west of the intersection with Canyon Road (former SR-146) is included in the National Highway System.

== History ==
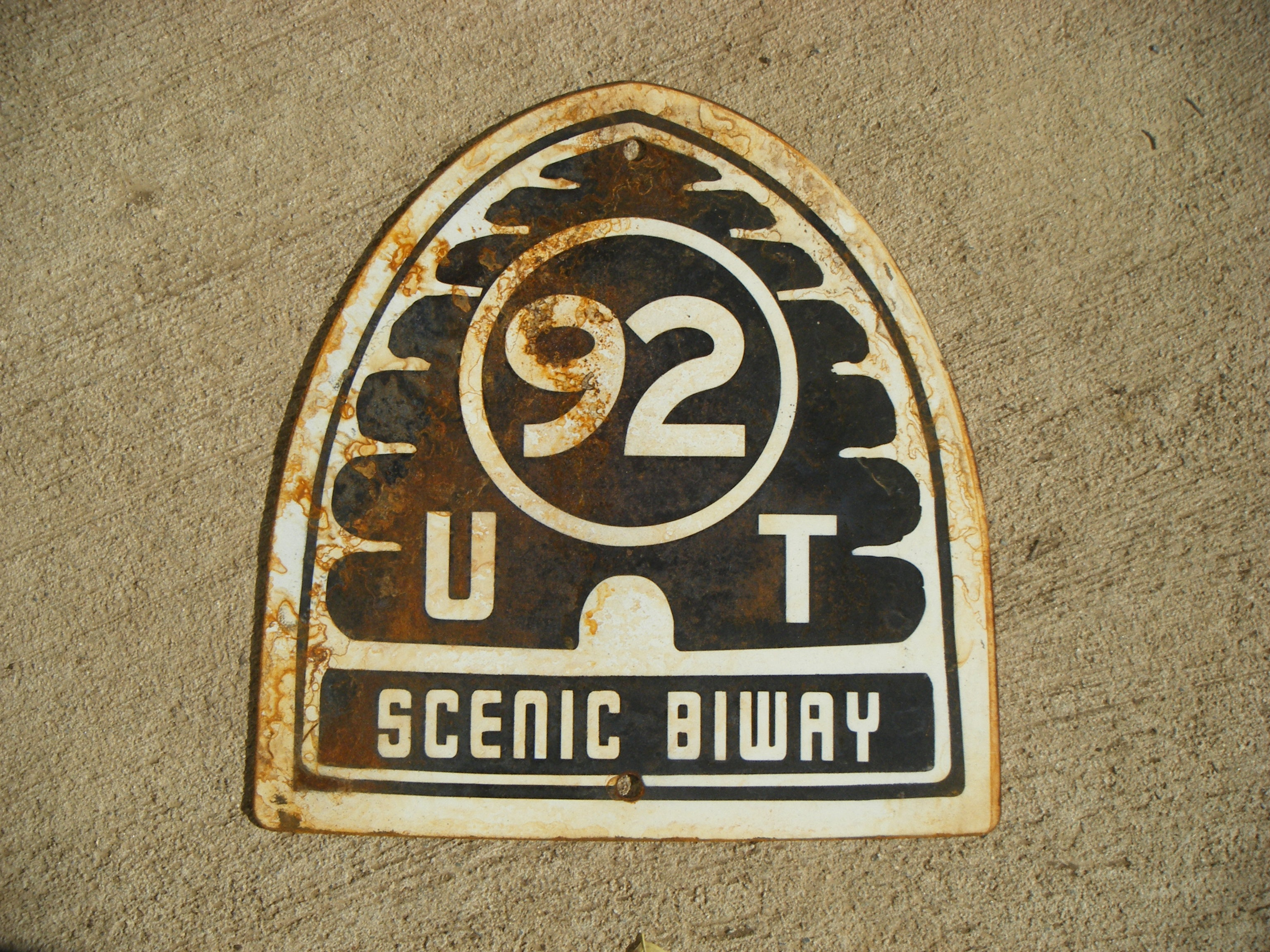
UT-92 Scenic Biway marker

The state legislature created State Route 80 in 1935, connecting SR-1 (US-91, now I-15/US-89) near Point of the Mountain with SR-74 south of Alpine. An extension in 1941 took SR-80 east to the Uinta National Forest boundary in American Fork Canyon, replacing a short piece of SR-146 (created in 1933) from SR-74 to the mouth of the canyon. At the other end of the highway, State Route 168 was built in 1933 as a forest road and numbered in 1935, connecting SR-7 (US-189) with Aspen Grove. SR-80 was extended through the forest to SR-7, absorbing SR-168, in 1953. Because the number 80 was needed for I-80, SR-80 was renumbered SR-92 in the 1977 renumbering.

=== Commuter lanes ===
The Timpanogos Highway Commuter Lanes, built from May 2009 to October 2011, are a 3.6-mile (5.8 km) grade-separated parallel road of Timpanogos Highway in Lehi with one lane in each direction to bypass signal-controlled intersections. The west ramp of the commuter lane is next to the Interstate 15 intersection near North Frontage Road, the east ramp is between Highland Boulevard and North Tamarack Drive. The estimated costs were $170 million.

== Major intersections ==
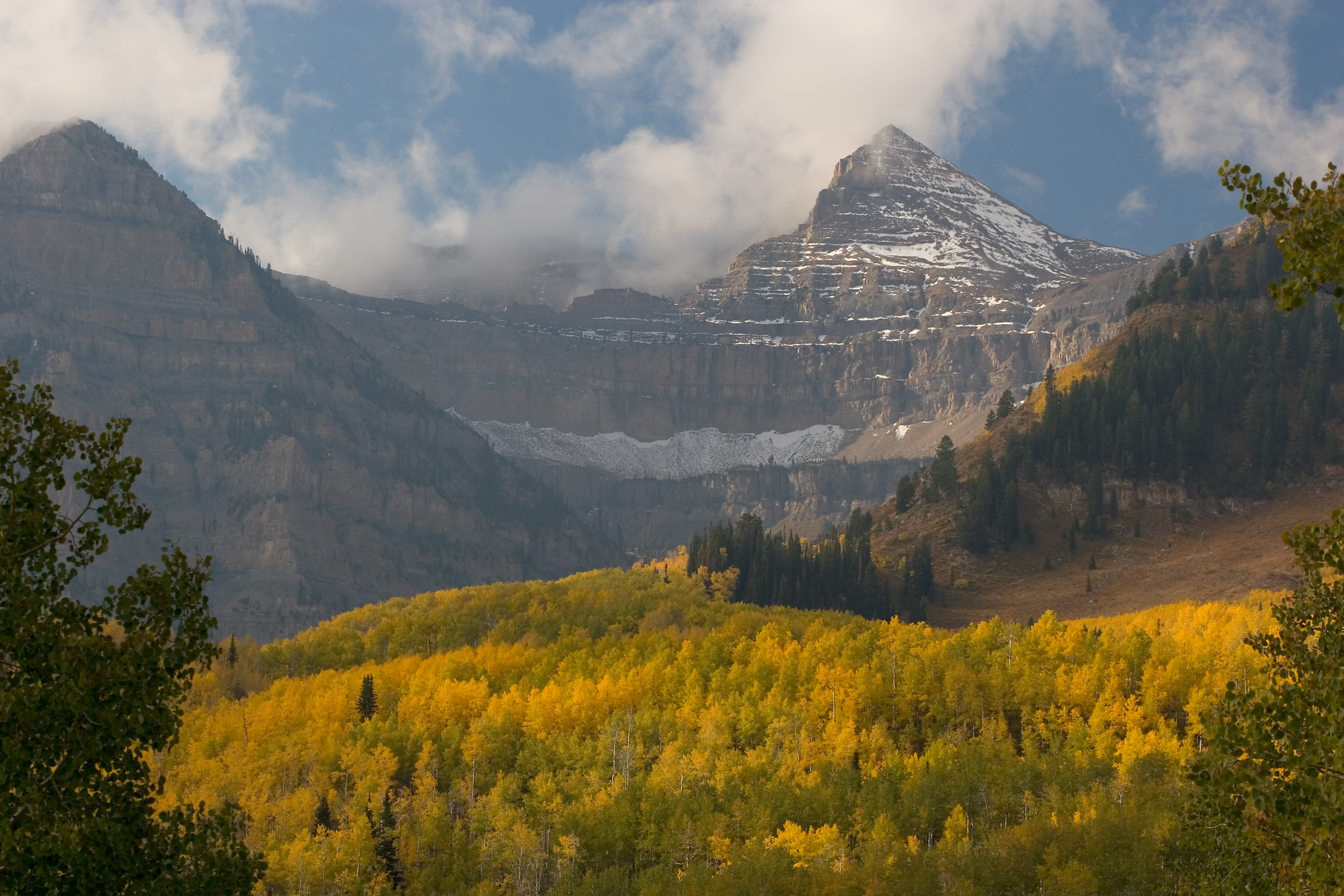
A view of Mount Timpanogos from the Alpine Loop, October 2004

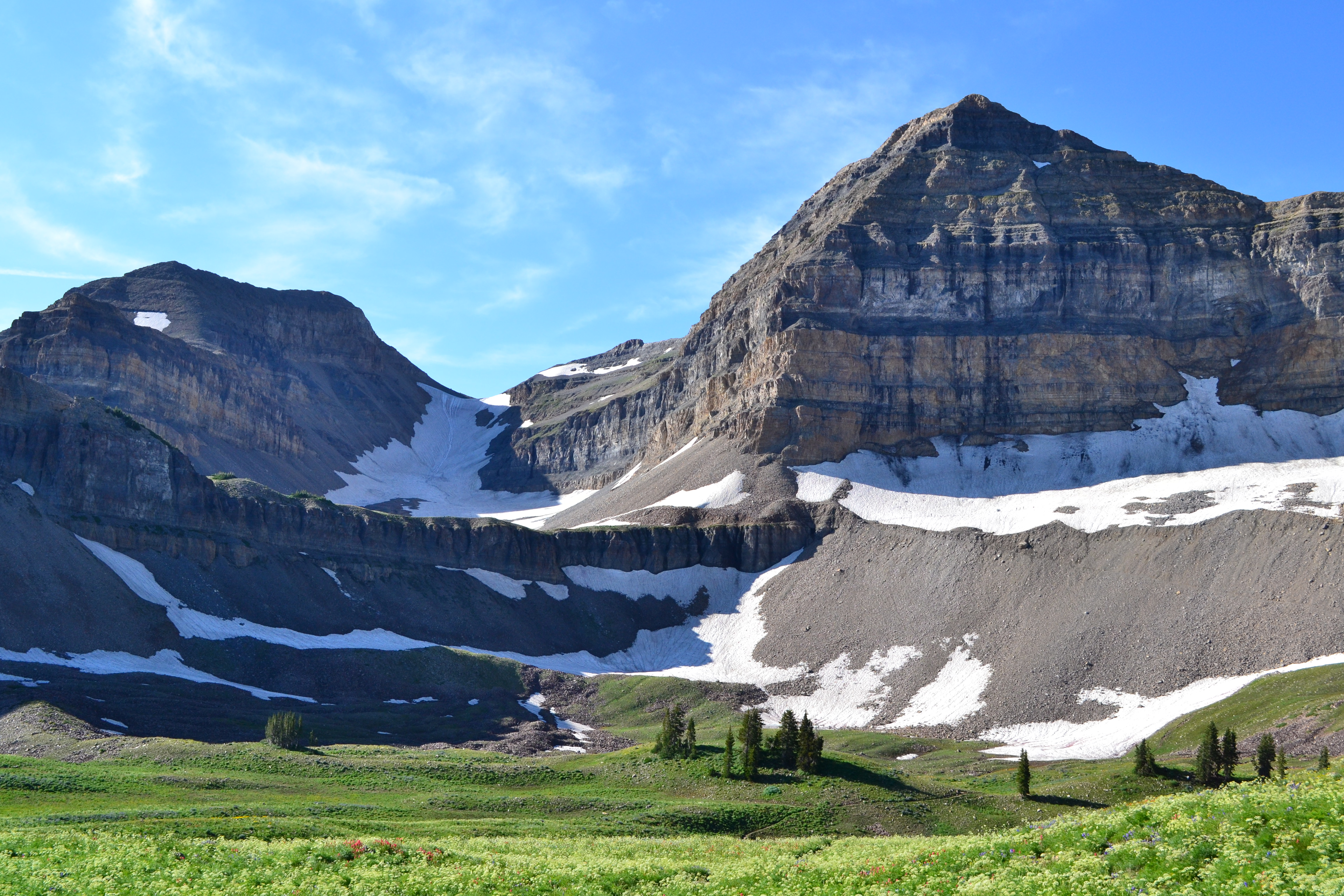
Mount Timpanogos and "Timp Glacier", August 2011

County	Location	mi	km	Destinations	Notes
Utah	Lehi	0.000	0.000	Ashton Boulevard	Western terminus Road continues west as Club House Drive
Utah	Lehi	0.166– 0.358	0.267– 0.576	I-15 / US 89 – Provo, Salt Lake City	I-15 exit 284; The 7th diverging diamond interchange in the United States and the 2nd in Utah
Utah	Lehi	0.592	0.953	West ramp onto eastbound commuter lane	
Utah	Lehi	1.017	1.637	West ramp from westbound commuter lane	
Utah	Lehi	3.122	5.024	East ramp from eastbound commuter lane	
Utah	Highland	4.041	6.503	East ramp onto westbound commuter lane	
Utah	Highland	5.830	9.382	SR-74 (Alpine Highway) – Alpine, American Fork	
Utah	Highland	6.447	10.375	SR-129 (North County Boulevard) – American Fork, Pleasant Grove, Lindon	Northern Terminus of SR-129
Utah	Cedar Hills–Highland line	7.583	12.204	Canyon Road - Pleasant Grove	Former SR-146
Utah	American Fork Canyon	10.204– 10.279	16.422– 16.542	Timpanogos Cave National Monument Visitor Center	
Utah	American Fork Canyon	12.675	20.398	SR-144 north – Tibble Fork Reservoir	Southern Terminus of SR-144
Wasatch	No major junctions				
Utah		18.829	30.302	Forest Road 114 east (Cascade Scenic Drive) - Cascade Springs	
Utah	Wildwood	27.296	43.929	US 189 – Provo, Heber City	Eastern terminus, in Provo Canyon near Wasatch County line
1.000 mi = 1.609 km; 1.000 km = 0.621 mi: Concurrency terminus; Proposed; Incomplete access; Route transition
