= Utah State Route 146 (1933–2014) =

Former state highway in Utah, United States

State Route 146
- Canyon Road; 100 East
- Former SR-146 highlighted in red

Route information
- Maintained by UDOT
- Length: 5.306 mi (8.539 km)
- Existed: 1933–2014

Major junctions
- South end: US 89 in Pleasant Grove
- North end: SR-92 in Cedar Hills

Location
- Country: United States
- State: Utah

Highway system
- Utah State Highway System; Interstate; US; State; Minor; Scenic

State Route 146 (SR-146) was a state highway in the U.S. state of Utah that connected the city of Pleasant Grove with SR-92 at the mouth of American Fork Canyon, some 5.3 miles (8.5 km) to the north in Utah County.

== Route description ==
Route 146 started in Pleasant Grove at the intersection of 100 East and State Street US-89. Travelling north on 100 East, the route left Pleasant Grove, turned into Canyon Road, and traveled along the eastern foothills of Cedar Hills, Utah until it ended at the Alpine Loop Scenic Byway at the mouth of American Fork Canyon.

== History ==
State Route 146 was first established in 1933, with its south end at US-89 (then known as Route 1, and later as Route 8) in Pleasant Grove, and its north end connecting with what was then SR-71 (now numbered SR-74) south of Alpine and west of the mouth of American Fork Canyon. SR-92 (then numbered SR-80) was established in 1935 and had its eastern terminus at SR-74, but in 1941 was extended east to the Uinta National Forest boundary in American Fork Canyon, replacing the 1.7-mile (2.7 km) stretch of SR-146 between SR-74 and the mouth of the canyon.

SR-146 remained unchanged until 2014, when it was decommissioned in a jurisdictional transfer with Utah County. In exchange for the creation of State Route 129 along North County Boulevard, all of SR-146 was removed from the state highway system. The former route is now maintained by the Utah County Public Works department and is funded with county funds. The transfer was approved by the Utah Transportation Commission on December 5, 2014.

== Major intersections ==
The entire route was in Utah County.

Location	mi	km	Destinations	Notes
Pleasant Grove	0.000	0.000	US 89 (State Street)	Southern terminus
Cedar Hills	5.306	8.539	SR-92 (Alpine Loop Scenic Byway)	Northern terminus
1.000 mi = 1.609 km; 1.000 km = 0.621 mi
