= Profire Energy =

Oilfield technology company

- Company type: Subsidiary of: CECO Environmental; (2024–present)
- Traded as: Nasdaq: PFIE (formerly)
- Industry: Oil and Gas industry
- Founders: Brenton Hatch; Harold Albert
- Headquarters: Lindon, Utah
- Area served: Worldwide
- Key people: Cameron Tidball ( Vice President, & General Manager; Ryan Oviatt (Vice President of Strategy & Integration)
- Revenue: ▲US$ 58.21M (2023)
- Net income: ▲US$ 10.78M (2023)
- Total assets: ▲US$ 66.29M (2023)
- Total equity: ▲US$ 56.84M (2023)
- Owner: CECO Environmental; (2025–present)
- Number of employees: > 150 (2024)
- Website: profireenergy.com

Profire Energy is an oilfield technology company, specializing in the design of burner-management systems (BMS) and other combustion-management technologies.

It serves the upstream and midstream portions of the oil/gas industry, providing systems that monitor and manage the burners used in the industry's combustion vessels (e.g. tanks, dehydrators, separators, etc.).

Profire Energy has offices in Lindon, Utah; Victoria, Texas; Midland-Odessa, Texas; Homer, Pennsylvania; Greeley, Colorado; Millersburg, Ohio; and Acheson, Alberta, Canada.

== History ==
Profire Energy was established in Alberta, Canada in March 2002 as a private company (Profire Combustion). Brenton W. Hatch and Harold E. Albert co-founded the company to service oil/gas producers, but soon created a control panel for the management of burners, a system called the Profire 1100.

After a few years of continued development, the company made the decision to go public (in 2008) under the name Profire Energy, Inc. (OTCBB: PFIE). They have since developed additional (and more advanced) products, opened multiple offices throughout the US, and continued development of their product line for domestic and international use.

In 2025, CECO Environmental completed the purchase of Profire for approximately $122.7 million.

== Markets ==
Profire Energy predominately serves the North American upstream and midstream oil/gas industry, but announced a Brazilian distribution channel in early 2012, as well as an Australian distribution channel in early 2014.
