= Utah State Route 135 =

State highway in Utah, United States

State Route 135
- SR-135 highlighted in red

Route information
- Maintained by UDOT
- Length: 0.726 mi (1,168 m)
- Existed: 2016–present

Major junctions
- West end: 2800 West on the Lindon–American Fork line
- I-15 on the Lindon–Pleasant Grove line
- East end: SR-129 in Pleasant Grove

Location
- Country: United States
- State: Utah
- Counties: Utah

Highway system
- Utah State Highway System; Interstate; US; State; Minor; Scenic
| ← SR-134 | → SR-136 |

State Route 135 (SR-135) is a short divided state highway in northern Utah County, Utah, United States. The route spans east–west (or more accurately, northeast–southwest) for 0.726 miles (1.168 km) to connect the far northeastern part of Lindon and Interstate 15 (I-15) with SR-129 (North County Boulevard) in the southeastern part of Pleasant Grove. The majority of the route runs along Pleasant Grove Boulevard.

== Route description ==
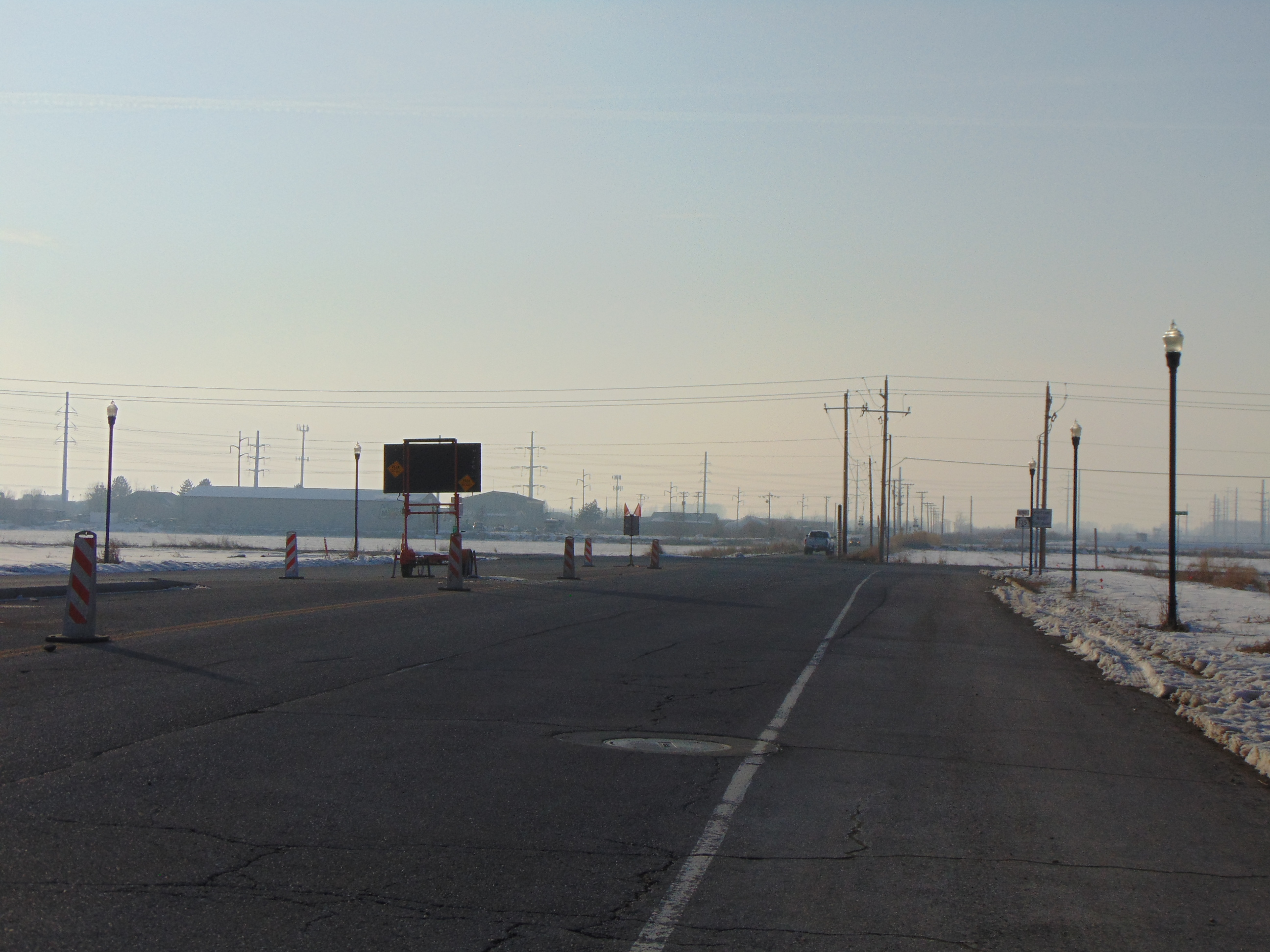
Western terminus at the border between Lindon and American Fork

SR-135 is a four-lane connector road that runs through formerly agricultural area that has recently been developed commercially.

The route begins at a four-way intersection with 2800 West on the border line of American Fork and Lindon. From its western terminus, the route heads east in Lindon as 600 North for about 500 feet (150 m) as a four-lane road (with no median) before turning northeast and gaining its median, which it retains for the remainder of the route. (Note: Nearly all of the median of SR-135 (Pleasant Grove Boulevard) been improved and landscaped with xeriscape trees and shrubs.)

After turning northeast, SR-135 quickly reaches the diamond interchange with I-15 (Exit 275), which has been substantially landscaped (xeriscape) since its construction. As is crosses over I-15 the route leaves Lindon and enters Pleasant Grove, becoming Pleasant Grove Boulevard. Northeast of I-15, SR-135 continues northeast and the westbound lanes connect with the south end of Granite Way before the route reaches its eastern terminus at SR-129 (North County Boulevard). The roadway continues northeast towards downtown Pleasant Grove, ultimately connecting with State Street (US-89).

== History ==
In 2002, a new roadway was complete in northwest Lindon and southwest Pleasant Grove. The road included a new interchange along I-15 and connected 600 North in Lindon (to the southwest) with State Street (US-89) in Pleasant Grove (at what was formerly a three way intersection with Center Street). Most of the new road was named Pleasant Grove Boulevard. Four years later, with the completion of North County Boulevard (SR-129), the section of the roadway between 2800 West and North County Boulevard (SR-129) was designated as State Route 135.

== Major intersections ==
The entire route is in Utah County.

| Location | mi | km | Destinations | Notes |
|---|---|---|---|---|
| American Fork–Lindon line | 0.000 | 0.000 | 2800 West | Western terminus |
| Lindon–Pleasant Grove line | 0.324– 0.398 | 0.521– 0.641 | I-15 – American Fork, Orem, Provo, Salt Lake City | Diamond interchange |
| Pleasant Grove | 0.726 | 1.168 | SR-129 (North County Boulevard) – Lindon, American Fork, Highland | Eastern terminus |
1.000 mi = 1.609 km; 1.000 km = 0.621 mi

== See also ==
- List of highways numbered 135
