= Chandler David Hendry =

American Christian social media figure (1998/1999–2026)

- Born: March 6, 1999; Midway, Utah, U.S.
- Died: August 7, 2026 (aged 27); Lehi, Utah, U.S.
- Other name: Chuck Hendry
- Occupations: Social media personality, lay apologist
- Known for: Founder of Restored Truth
- Spouse: AnaLynn Hudson Hendry

Chandler David Hendry (1998 or 1999 – August 7, 2026), known as Chuck Hendry, was an American social media personality and lay apologist for The Church of Jesus Christ of Latter-day Saints (LDS Church). He was the founder of Restored Truth, a ministry focused on defending LDS doctrine and encouraging missionary work. He died at age 27 in a car crash in Lehi, Utah, while driving to the FAIR apologetics conference.

== Early life ==
According to his public social media profile, Hendry was from Midway, Utah, and attended Wasatch High School.

== Career ==
Hendry posted his first video in March 2025 and went on to produce approximately 250 additional videos across five social media platforms over the following year and a half. His YouTube channel had about 11,000 subscribers at the time of his death. Under the "Restored Truth" name, he discussed scripture, Christian and LDS history, and interfaith dialogue, and engaged with critics and skeptics of the faith. He closed his videos by saying "Keep your knees on the ground and your eyes toward heaven."

On September 12, 2025, Hendry spoke at a Provo, Utah, vigil held in memory of Charlie Kirk, organized by BYU student publication The Cougar Chronicle in the days following Kirk's death. Hendry recounted having briefly met Kirk shortly before Kirk's assassination, and said that "the Savior now more than ever needs us to live for Him." He closed his remarks urging attendees to "follow our Savior, whatever the cost." Excerpts of the speech recirculated widely in tributes to Hendry after his own death less than a year later.

In the days before his death, Hendry organized an in-person "Mission Prep" event in Orem, Utah, intended to help young Latter-day Saints prepare to serve missions.

== Personal life ==
Hendry married AnaLynn Hudson in a sealing ceremony at the Mount Timpanogos Utah Temple on September 21, 2024.

=== Death ===
Hendry died on August 7, 2026, following a three-vehicle crash at the intersection of Morning Vista Road and Timpanogos Highway in Lehi, Utah, at approximately 8:25 a.m. Witnesses told police he ran a red light and struck two other vehicles; occupants of the other vehicles were not seriously injured. Police said Hendry was not wearing a seat belt. He was taken to a hospital, where he was pronounced dead. He had been driving to attend the FAIR apologetics conference at the time of the crash.

The "Mission Prep" event he had organized went forward the next day, August 8, in Orem with the support of his wife and became an impromptu tribute to him after attendees learned of his death. A GoFundMe campaign established to assist his wife and parents with funeral expenses raised more than $76,000 toward an $80,000 goal.

=== Responses ===
Tributes to Hendry came from across the LDS online creator community. Cardon Ellis of Ward Radio, who helped organize the Orem tribute event, called Hendry a "kingdom builder." Fellow content creator Cade Alvey, co-host of the podcast All Those in Favor, said Hendry "wanted all of us to be confident before God, confident in our faith and confident in our religious convictions." Other creators, including Jacob Hansen of the Thoughtful Faith podcast and Dalton Williams of the Unashamed Truth channel, credited Hendry with encouraging missionary work and inspiring their own faith-based content. Scholar and apologist Daniel Peterson also noted Hendry's death and his remarks at the Kirk vigil in a personal blog post reflecting on the FAIR conference that Hendry had been travelling to at the time of the crash.
