= Murdock Canal =

Provo River Aqueduct
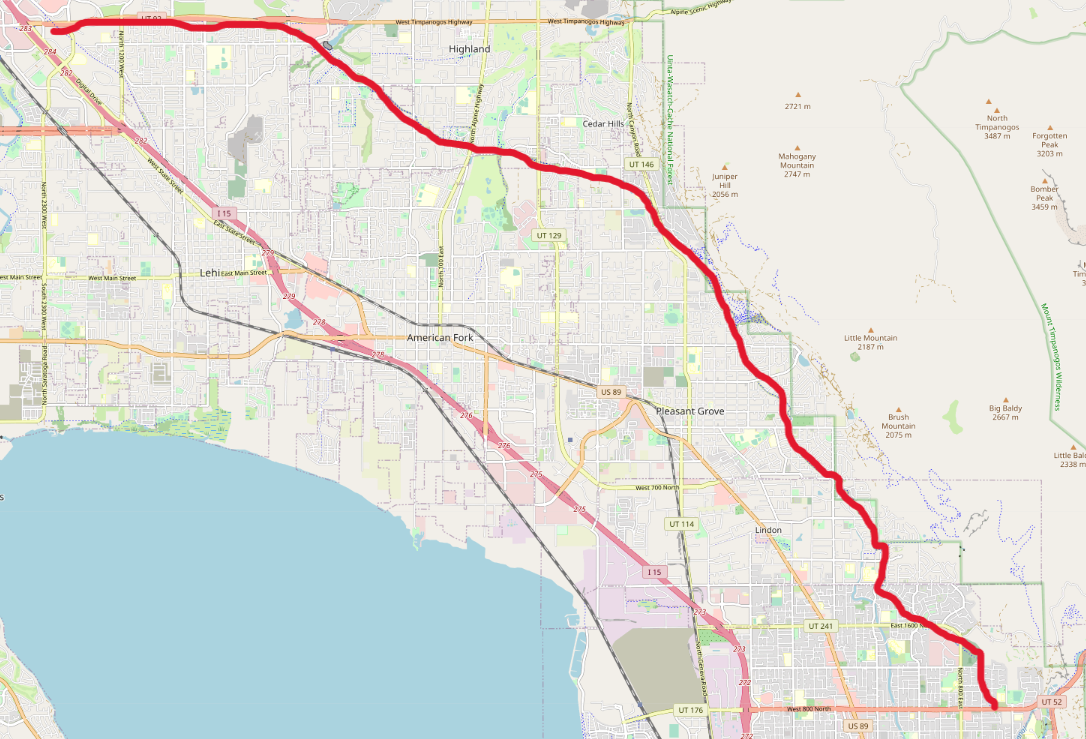
- Interactive map of Provo River Aqueduct
- Location: Utah
- Country: United States

Specifications
- Length: 21 miles (34 km)

History
- Former names: Murdock Canal
- Modern name: Provo River Aqueduct
- Current owner: Provo River Water Users Association

Geography
- Beginning coordinates: 40.4499°N 111.9192°W
- Ending coordinates: 40.3245°N 111.6431°W

The Murdock Canal, also known as the Provo Reservoir Canal and the Provo River Aqueduct, is a 23 mile water conveyance system that diverts water from the Provo River and other water storage systems to water users in Utah County. The canal starts at the Murdock Diversion Dam which is located at the mouth of Provo Canyon in Provo, Utah. The canal runs completely underground through Utah Valley and ends at the Jordan Aqueduct in Lehi, Utah. It carries water through the cities of Orem, Lindon, Pleasant Grove, Cedar Hills, American Fork, Highland, and Lehi. The canal is the largest of three primary water conveyance systems in Salt Lake Valley, the other systems being the Jordan Aqueduct and the Salt Lake Aqueduct. The water capacity of the Murdock Canal more than doubles that of either the Jordan Aqueduct or Salt Lake Aqueduct at 612 cfs (cubic feet per second).

== History and background ==
Both anciently and presently, civilizations have made use of canals and aqueducts to irrigate their farmland, prevent flooding, to navigate, and supply water to their people. While generally canals supply a means of transportation for a community, the Murdock Canal was constructed nearly exclusively for public municipal water use in Utah County. It was built in the early 1900s by the Utah Lake Irrigation Company, under the direction of Joseph R. Murdock. After being owned privately for many years, the government purchased the canal from the Provo Reservoir Company in 1940 with plans to expand its water capacity. Renovations for enlargement began in 1942 but were stopped shortly after due to World War II. In November of 1943, the War Production Board approved commencement of the canal expansion. Once complete, the Murdock Canal more than doubled its water capacity, increasing from 230 cubic feet per second (6.5 m^{3}/s) to 550 cubic feet per second (16 m^{3}/s). After the expansion, more renovations for the addition of three siphons and a flume to the canal were authorized by the War Production Board. The bids for each of these renovations opened in March 1944 and were given to various contractors. Many smaller but significant additions were made to the canal in the following years including the addition of a stirring pool, two turnouts, and a concrete channel by the end of 1950.

=== Provo River Project ===
The Murdock Canal is part of a much larger water supply system called the Provo River Project. Other structures included as part of the Provo River Project are the Deer Creek Dam, Deer Creek Reservoir, Deer Creek Powerplant, Salt Lake Aqueduct, Terminal Reservoir, Murdock Diversion Dam, Weber-Provo Diversion Canal, Duchesne Tunnel, Jordan Narrows Siphon and Plumbing Plant, and the South Lateral.

=== Murdock Diversion Dam ===
The Murdock Diversion Dam, another part of the Provo River Project, marks the beginning of the Murdock Canal. The dam was built well after the canal in 1950 by the Provo River Water Users Association in order to slow and maintain the flow of water from the Provo River.

== Operation and management ==
The canal is operated by the Provo River Water Users Association. The canal facilitates transportation of the municipal water supply to the public between April and October, and is decommissioned each winter.. At the beginning of irrigation season, the Association is in charge of filling the aqueduct. They ensure that all equipment is inspected before startup. The canal takes about 185 acre-feet to fill up every year. During the off-season, everything is inspected, cleared of debris, and the gates are maintained. The canal carries about 400 million gallons of water to water users in Utah County at a maximum capacity of 612 cfs. The canal transports water from the Provo river, Deer Creek Reservoir, and Jordanelle reservoir.

The recreational trail known as the Murdock Canal Trail is located on top of the canal for 17 miles. The Murdock canal is part of the Provo River Project, which includes many other dams, channels, and canals that provide supplemental irrigation water for farms throughout Utah.

== Design ==
The Murdock canal is primarily underground, enclosed with 21 miles of welded steel pipes. The majority of the piping is 126 inches in diameter, but due to varying geologic factors, certain sections of the canal are cased in steel pipe with the diameters of 133", 120", 96", and 84" (between 7 and 12 feet). The steel piping is placed in trapezoidal shaped excavation and surrounded by granular material.

== Provo Reservoir Canal Enclosure Project ==
Controversy over the Murdock Canal's safety arose in 1994 after a number of people fell into the canal and drowned. This controversy eventually led to the proposal of closing off the canal entirely. In 2010, the Bureau of Reclamation and Provo River Water Users Association hired CH2M Hill to enclose the Murdock Canal, allowing the water to be transported underground without risking the safety of the community. The project was originally estimated to take three years to complete, but was finished in just two years in April of 2012. The canal was thoroughly inspected and started back up in May 2012. The Provo Reservoir Canal Enclosure Project was completed in three phases during winter during the time in which the canal was already routinely decommissioned for yearly service. The entire project cost about $150 million, $39 million of which being provided by the Central Utah Project Completion Act from the Department of Interior.

=== Benefits ===
The enclosure of the Murdock Canal improved the public safety of the community, increased total canal water capacity and maximum water flow, minimized water loss within the enclosed pipes, and refined the process of improving water quality. The project improved canal water seepage and evaporation, preventing 2.6 billion gallons of water loss within the community of Utah County over the course of each year. The underground canal also allowed for better water quality due to the lack of exposure to the public. In addition to the increased instream flow to the Provo River, there came an improvement in the living conditions for many plant and animal species, including the endangered June sucker fish. As a fish that is native only to Utah, increased sanitation and reduced debris to their enclosed ecosystem benefitted their species greatly.

=== Challenges ===
Across the Murdock Canal's 23 mile path, it crosses a great number of varying conditions. Geologic hazards such as landslides, debris flows, and the Wasatch Fault have caused a number of complications for the interactions between the large volume of water, the pipe enclosure, and their surroundings. Because of these conditions, the enclosure needed to be built with materials that would minimize damage from these hazards and be most cost efficient. Some of the materials that were considered were precast concrete, cast-in-place concrete box culverts, low-head non-cylinder reinforced concrete pressure pipe, and welded-joint spirally-welded steel pressure pipe. CH2M Hill conducted tests with specific design elements that addressed each geologic issue. In their testing, the use of polyurethane coating on the steel pipe was found to reduce friction in landslide and fault areas. Consequently, steel pipe was chosen as the material for the enclosure project. By choosing steel there was a significant decrease in leakage threats, which allowed the project to proceed without having to build drainage for the canal and therefore reducing the cost of production while simultaneously increasing the efficiency of the canal.

== Murdock Trail ==
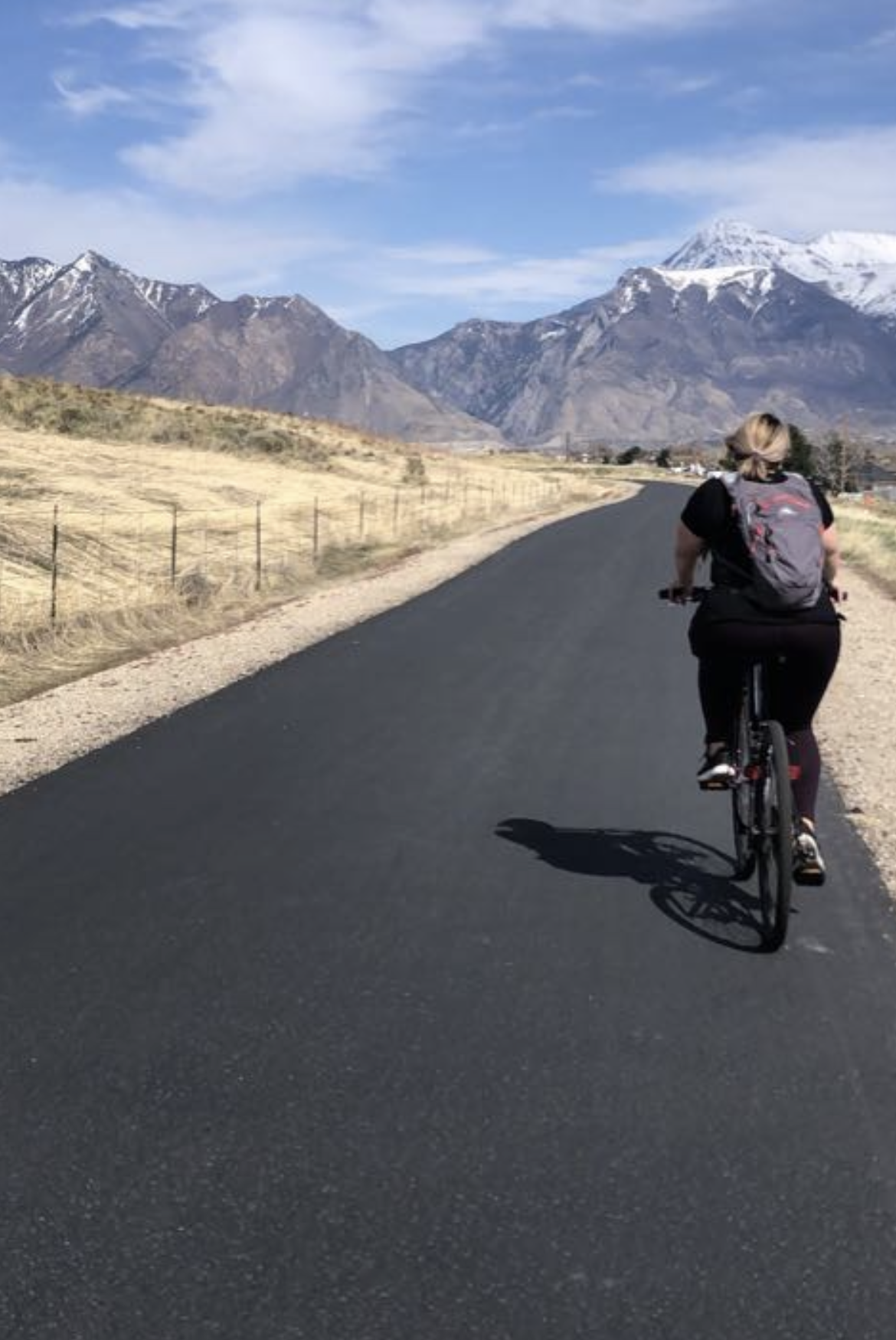
Murdock Canal Trail, Lehi

Before the piping and burying of the Murdock Canal, building a trail alongside the Murdock Canal was denied by the Provo River Water Users Association. After the completion of the Provo Reservoir Canal Enclosure Project, construction of a paved trail began directly on top of the enclosed project. The Murdock Canal Trail is a 17 mile paved recreational trail that travels the majority of the length of the Murdock Canal. The trail runs through the cities of American Fork, Lehi, Orem, Pleasant Grove, Cedar Hills, Highland, and Lindon, beginning about a mile away from the mouth of Provo Canyon in Orem and ending near Traverse Mountain in Lehi. Along the length of the trail there are six trailheads with parking, water fountains, restrooms, and picnic tables. The trail crosses nineteen roads, has eight undercrossing tunnels, and travels across two bridges. The trail was completed in 2013 and was made freely available to the general public.
