= Celestia Taylor =

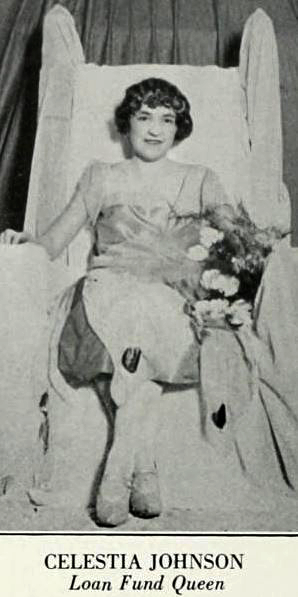
Celestia Johnson, loan fund queen in her graduating class at Brigham Young University in 1925.

Celestia Marguerita Johnson Taylor (April 8, 1903 – July 28, 1996) was a professor of English at Brigham Young University (BYU) and a member of the Relief Society general board. She wrote a column on homemaking for Relief Society Magazine (1966–70). She was an avid singer and sang in many musical performances at BYU. She participated in the last worldwide LDS Church chorus competition and won. During her time at BYU, Taylor served in multiple associations and boards, and she lectured during BYU's education week.

== Early life ==
Taylor was born on April 8, 1903, in Alpine, Utah. Her parents were Jesse Wanderus and Deseret Nash Johnson. Her father, Jesse, was a school principal and business organizer. Her childhood was a happy one; her parents provided her with "every advantage our world had to offer". She attended high school at the BYU high school. Taylor and her sister Violet would accompany professors on their lecture tours in neighboring towns to sing and read poetry. As a teenager, she was in high demand as a babysitter, because she would often wash floors or iron shirts at the same time, feeling compelled to do unfinished household chores. Her first year of high school, she took on responsibility for the family cow, milking it and taking it out to pasture two miles away.

== Education ==
She studied music and education at BYU. She was awarded "most popular girl of the year" her freshman year in 1922, won a vocal contest in 1923, and graduated in 1925. She and her sister Violet studied at UC Berkeley the summer after Taylor's graduation. The next summer, she attended the Columbia Teachers College in New York City. She married Lynn Dixon Taylor in August 1927, and together they had five children. Lynn joined the faculty at BYU in 1931, enabling Celestia to take classes free of charge. She took classes from Lynn, Alice Louise Reynolds, Elise Chamberlain Carrol, and P. A. Christianson. Later on, the dean of graduate studies told her she could apply much of her credit to a master's degree if she completed it in the next two years, and in 1953, she received her MA.

Taylor taught English at BYU until 1974. She taught English as a second language, freshman English, and other English courses. She served as vice president of BYU's alumni association, on the executive board of Friends of the BYU library, and as BYU Women president. She was a member of various writing organizations and between 1980 and 1982 she was president of the National League of American Pen Women.

== Music ==
As a girl and teenager, Taylor studied music with Clair Reid at BYU. Reid often placed Taylor in vocal solos with BYU choirs in high school and college. Together with her sisters Violet and Rhoda, Taylor sang in "The Johnson Sisters Trio". During the flu epidemic of 1918, the trio, along with Murray Roberts, sang at many graveside funeral arrangements—as many as four in one day. Taylor and Violet sang in the Provo Tabernacle Choir under the direction of Professor J. R. Boshard. She was state chairwoman of fine arts for the Utah State Federated Women's club for three years. She sang a part in most of Florence Jepperson's productions, including in the chorus of Priscilla.

Taylor sang in many operas and musicals and performed in plays during her high school and college years. She won the last worldwide LDS Church chorus competition in directing both a women's chorus and the men's chorus (afterwards competitions were strictly regional).

She sang as an opera singer in William Hanson's local opera "Tam-Man Nacup" in 1933 and at Gerrit de Jong's organ recital in 1936. She was a member and officer of the Utah Opera Association.

== Church service ==
She was a member of the Relief Society general board between 1962 and 1975. She wrote a report on "divine law and church government" about how the church helps members progress. She wrote the column "Development Through Homemaking Education" for Relief Society Magazine between 1966 and 1970, covering diverse topics like family budgeting, record keeping, interior decorating, and storing food for hard times. She also lectured at BYU's Education Week and other continuing education seminars.

== Selected Relief Society Magazine articles ==
- "Let's Go Inside"
- "Outside Housekeeping"
- "Gardening Appearance"
- "House Plants"
- "Garden Convenience and Safety"
- "'She Looketh Well to the Ways of Her Household'"
- "'She Perceiveth Her Merchandise Is Good'"
