= Mount Timpanogos Utah Temple =

Latter-day Saints temple in American Fork, Utah, United States

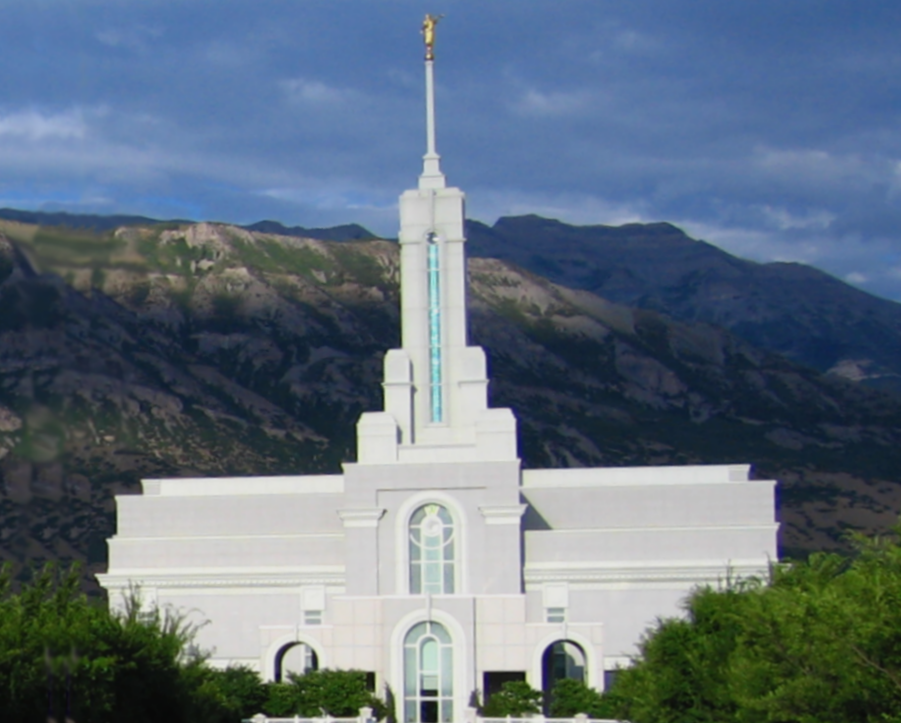
- Interactive map of Mount Timpanogos Utah Temple
- Number: 49
- Dedication: October 13, 1996, by Gordon B. Hinckley
- Site: 16.7 acres (6.8 ha)
- Floor area: 107,240 ft^{2} (9,963 m^{2})
- Height: 190 ft (58 m)
- Official website • News & images

Church chronology
← Hong Kong China Temple	Mount Timpanogos Utah Temple	→ St. Louis Missouri Temple

Additional information
- Announced: October 3, 1992, by Ezra Taft Benson
- Groundbreaking: October 9, 1993, by Gordon B. Hinckley
- Open house: August 6 – September 21, 1996
- Designed by: Allen Erekson, Keith Stepan, and Church A&E Services
- Location: American Fork, Utah, United States
- Coordinates: 40°23′34.02960″N 111°46′14.12399″W
- Exterior finish: Sierra white granite clad temple with art glass windows and bronze doors
- Design: Classic modern, single-spire design
- Baptistries: 1
- Ordinance rooms: 4 (stationary)
- Sealing rooms: 8
- Clothing rental: Yes

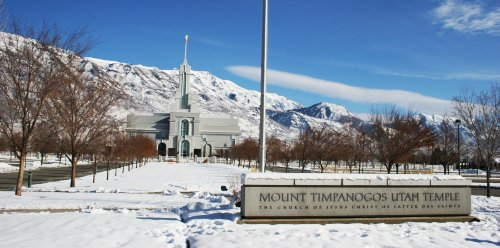
Mt. Timpanogos temple during winter.

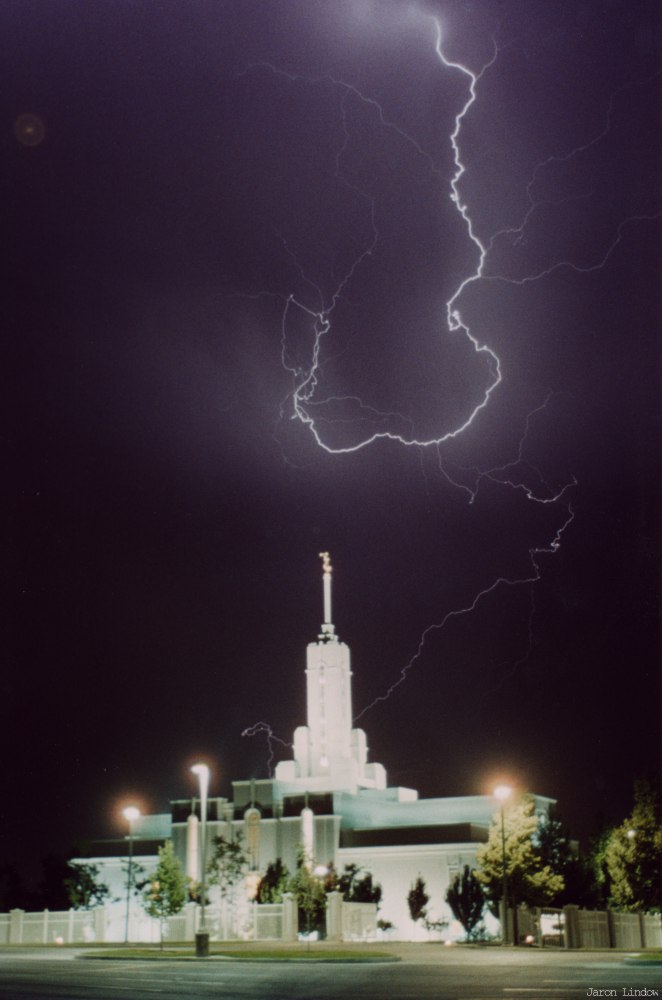
Mt. Timpanogos temple during lightning storm.

The Mount Timpanogos Utah Temple is the 49th operating temple of the Church of Jesus Christ of Latter-day Saints. The temple is located in American Fork, Utah. It is the second temple built in Utah County, and the ninth in Utah. The intent to build the temple was announced on October 3, 1992, by Gordon B. Hinckley, first counselor in the First Presidency, during general conference.

The temple has a single-spire design, and was designed by Allen Erekson, Keith Stepan, and church architectural staff. A groundbreaking ceremony, to signify the beginning of construction, was held on October 9, 1993, with Hinckley presiding.

== History ==
=== Announcement ===
The temple was announced by Gordon B. Hinckley, then a counselor in the First Presidency, in general conference on October 3, 1992. The location, on land in American Fork previously used as a church welfare farm, was announced at the following conference six months later. The temple overlooks the cities of American Fork, Pleasant Grove, Cedar Hills, Highland and Alpine as well as nearby Utah Lake. Mount Timpanogos, the peak from which the temple gets its name, and the Wasatch Mountains serve as a backdrop.

Ground was broken for the temple a year after its announcement. Approximately 12,000 people gathered on the site for the ceremony. During the services, the location of the Madrid Spain Temple was announced.

Twenty-thousand people attended a ceremony as the angel Moroni statue was lifted to its resting place on the 190-foot (58 m) spire of the temple in July 1995. Once the statue was in place, the attendees broke into applause and then spontaneously began to sing The Spirit of God.

After construction was completed, 679,217 people toured the temple during the six weeks (August 10 – September 21, 1996) of its public open house. More than 800 children's choirs, made up from nearly every ward and branch in the temple district, performed near the front entrance to the temple at least once during the open house.

=== Dedication ===
The temple was dedicated on October 13, 1996 by Hinckley, who by then was the church's president. The dedication sessions were held over an entire week, with three on Sunday and four on each of the following days, for a total of 27.

Before the dedication, Hinckley and his counselors in the First Presidency, Thomas S. Monson and James E. Faust, applied mortar to the temple's cornerstone. They were followed by Boyd K. Packer, Acting President of the Quorum of the Twelve Apostles; W. Eugene Hansen of the Seventy and executive director of the church's Temple Department; Robert J. Matthews, temple president; Stephen M. Studdert, vice chairman of the temple committee; and Hinckley's wife, Marjorie.

About 11,615 people participated in the first dedicatory session, with about 2,900 of them in the temple. The others attended via broadcast in the American Fork Tabernacle, 12 stake centers in Utah and Wasatch counties, and the Salt Lake Tabernacle on Temple Square in Salt Lake City. The First Presidency and Packer spoke in the first session and were accompanied by their wives.

About 38,000 attended the three sessions on the first day. During the week, Hinckley presided over and spoke in 11 dedicatory sessions, including the cornerstone ceremony. Monson and Faust each presided over eight dedicatory sessions, and each spoke in 11 sessions, which included the cornerstone ceremony. A total of 52 general authorities addressed the sessions, as well as the temple presidency and matron.

== Design and architecture ==
The building has a traditional Latter-day Saint temple design. Designed by Allen Erekson, Keith Stepan, and church architectural staff, the temple's architecture reflects both the cultural heritage of the Mount Timpanogos region and its spiritual significance to the church.

The temple has a total of 107,240 square feet (9,963 m^{2}), four ordinance rooms, eight sealing rooms, and one baptistry. The floor plan is an adaption of the one created for the Bountiful Utah Temple. The temples are nearly identical from the outside, though the spire on each is noticeably different.

The temple is on a 16.7-acre plot located to the west of Mount Timpanogos.

The structure stands 190 feet tall, constructed with sierra white granite. The exterior has stained glass windows created by an architectural glass designer, Gordon Huether, using a patented process called "Inner Light", bronze doors, and single spire.

=== Symbols ===
The design has elements representing Latter-day Saint symbolism, to provide spiritual meaning to its appearance and function. It shares symbolic elements with the Salt Lake and the Nauvoo temples, including sun, moon, and star stones, which represent the three degrees of glory, along with triple window towers to symbolize the priesthood, and window arch keystones which represent Christ.

=== Community efforts ===
The temple has played a role in creating a sense of community in the American Fork region since it was first announced in 1992. Local church members were eager to participate in the creation of the temple. Thousands of people gathered to clean up the temple grounds prior to the open house, and local newspapers created a special edition to commemorate its dedication. This commemorative edition included art, prose, and poetry submissions from readers and church members.

== Temple presidents ==
The church's temples are directed by a temple president and matron, each serving for a term of three years. The president and matron oversee the administration of temple operations and provide guidance and training for both temple patrons and staff.

Serving from 1996 to 1999, Robert J. Matthews was the first president, with Shirley N. Matthews serving as matron. As of 2024, Blaine L. Butler is the president, with Lynn M. Butler serving as matron.

Other temple presidents include L. Edward Brown (2008–11) and Noel B. Reynolds (2011–14).

== Admittance ==
When construction was completed, the church announced the public open house that was held from August 6-September 21, 1996 (excluding Sundays). The temple was dedicated by Gordon B. Hinckley during 27 sessions from October 13–19, 1996. Like all the church's temples, it is not used for Sunday worship services. To members of the church, temples are regarded as sacred houses of the Lord. Once dedicated, only church members with a current temple recommend can enter for worship.

== See also ==
Temples in Utah
Wasatch Front Temples
Temples along the Wasatch Front
- = Operating
- = Under construction
- = Announced
- = Temporarily Closed

- The Church of Jesus Christ of Latter-day Saints in Utah
- Comparison of temples of The Church of Jesus Christ of Latter-day Saints
- List of temples of The Church of Jesus Christ of Latter-day Saints
- List of temples of The Church of Jesus Christ of Latter-day Saints by geographic region
- Temple architecture (Latter-day Saints)
