= Utah State Route 144 =

Highway in American Fork Canyon

State Route 144
- SR-144 highlighted in red

Route information
- Maintained by UDOT
- Length: 2.478 mi (3.988 km)
- Existed: 1978–present

Major junctions
- South end: SR-92 in American Fork Canyon
- North end: Tibble Fork Reservoir

Location
- Country: United States
- State: Utah
- Counties: Utah

Highway system
- Utah State Highway System; Interstate; US; State; Minor; Scenic
| ← SR-143 | → SR-145 |

State Route 144 (SR-144) is a state highway in the U.S. state of Utah. Spanning 2.5 miles (4.0 km), it connects Tibble Fork Reservoir with American Fork Canyon.

== Route description ==
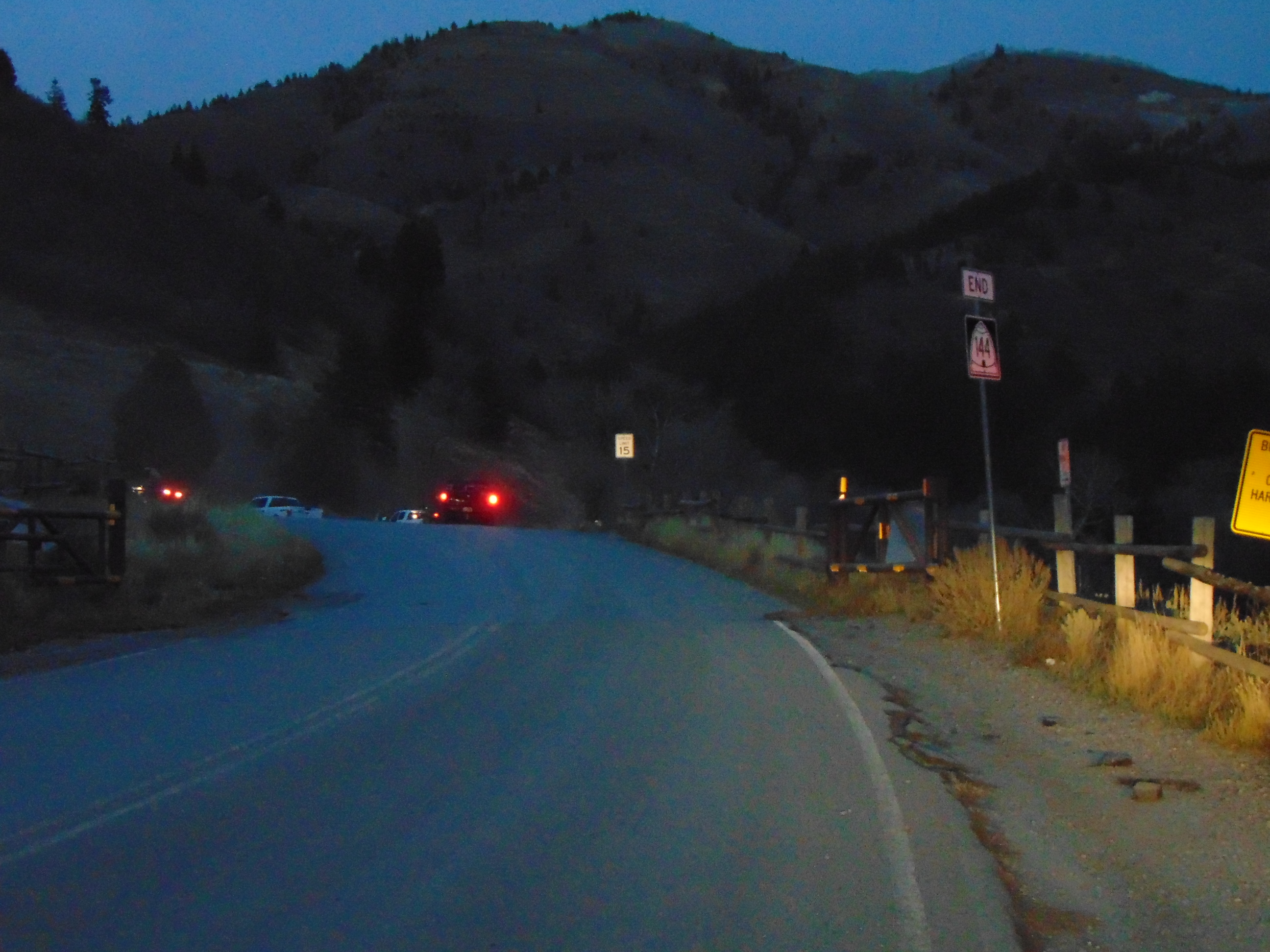
Northern terminus at Tibble Fork Reservoir

The route starts with its intersection with the Alpine Loop Scenic Byway (SR-92) in American Fork Canyon, Utah County, and travels north approximately 2.5 miles (4.0 km) to Tibble Fork Reservoir.

== History ==
The route was transferred from the Forest Service and designated a state highway in 1978, after the road was classified as a local road and there was interest in placing the road under state administration.

== Major intersections ==
The entire route is in Utah County.

| Location | mi | km | Destinations | Notes |
|---|---|---|---|---|
| American Fork Canyon | 0.000 | 0.000 | SR-92 | Southern terminus |
| | 2.478 | 3.988 | Seasonal gate at Tibble Fork Reservoir | Northern terminus |
1.000 mi = 1.609 km; 1.000 km = 0.621 mi
