= L. Edward Brown =

American Mormon leader and politician (born 1937)

Second Quorum of the Seventy
- April 6, 1996 – October 5, 2002
- Called by: Gordon B. Hinckley
- End reason: Honorably released

Personal details
- Born: Lowell Edward Brown; June 18, 1937 (age 89); Preston, Idaho, U.S.

Lowell Edward Brown (born June 18, 1937) is an American former politician in Idaho and a general authority of the Church of Jesus Christ of Latter-day Saints (LDS Church).

== Biography ==
Born in Preston, Idaho, in a Latter-day Saint family, Brown was raised in Logan, Utah, and was a missionary for the LDS Church in South Korea during the late 1950s, where he learned to speak fluent Korean.

After his missionary service, Brown earned a bachelor's degree from Utah State University and master's and doctorate degrees from the University of Kansas. He was employed as an instructor and supervisor in the LDS Church's Church Educational System.

Brown was a Republican politician and served a term as the mayor of Pocatello, Idaho. Later, he served three terms as a member of the Idaho House of Representatives.

In the LDS Church, Brown was a bishop and stake president in Pocatello; he also was the president of the church's Korean Mission from 1971 to 1974. He became an area seventy in 1995, and in 1996 became a general authority and a member of the church's Second Quorum of Seventy. During his time as a general authority, Brown served in the presidency of the Asia North Area of the church, which includes Korea and Japan. He was honorably released as a general authority in October 2002. Since his release, Brown has served as a counselor to the president and in 2009 was serving as the president of the church's Mt. Timpanogos Utah Temple.

Brown is married to Carol Ewer and resides in Lehi, Utah. The Browns are the parents of eight children.
