= CECO Environmental =

Technology company

CECO Environmental Corp.
- Type: Public
- Traded as: Nasdaq: CECO; Russell 2000 Component
- Industry: Pollution & treatment controls
- Founded: 1966; 60 years ago (as Claremont Engineering Company)
- Headquarters: Dallas, Texas, US
- Key people: Todd Gleason (CEO) (07/2020); Peter Johansson (CFO) (08/2022)
- Website: www.cecoenviro.com

CECO Environmental Corp. is an American industrial technology company founded in 1966 and headquartered in Dallas, Texas. It is publicly traded on the Nasdaq Stock Market under the ticker symbol CECO. The company provides air pollution control technology, products, and services for industrial markets, including manufacturing, chemical processing, energy, and refining.

Currently (2013.12) the company owns twelve subsidiaries. CECO Environmental acquired Met-Pro Corporation in August 2013. The acquisition was described by industry publications as significantly expanding CECO Environmental’s scale and portfolio in industrial air pollution control markets.

In September 2023, it was announced CECO Environmental had acquired the Pinellas Park, Florida-headquartered custom-engineered industrial water recycling and energy conservation company, Kemco Systems.

== Products ==
CECO Environmental describes its product portfolio as technologies used to reduce or eliminate pollutants including carbon monoxide, volatile organic compounds, nitrogen oxides, hazardous air pollutants, acid gases, and particulate matter.

CECO Environmental's products are organized into two operating segments: Engineered Systems and Industrial Process Solutions.

=== Engineered Systems ===
CECO provides custom-engineered systems and modular packages used to manage industrial air emissions and process fluids, including equipment such as scrubbers, cyclones, and filtration systems for particulate and emissions control applications.

=== Industrial Process Solutions ===
CECO also supplies engineered and configured products and related services used in industrial applications, including components and systems such as dampers and diverters, expansion joints, dust collectors, thermal oxidizers, wet and dry scrubbers, separators and coalescers, and water treatment packages.

=== Thermal solutions ===
Following CECO Environmental's June 2026 acquisition of Thermon Group Holdings, the company's portfolio expanded to include thermal management and industrial process heating products. Manufacturing Dive reported that Thermon made heat tracing cables, boilers, and other industrial equipment, and that the acquisition expanded CECO's portfolio beyond air pollution control, fluid handling, and filtration equipment.

== Corporate Acquisitions ==
CECO has expanded its portfolio over time through acquisitions across industrial air, industrial water, and combustion and safety solutions.

In 2015, CECO acquired Dallas-based PMFG, Inc. in a deal valued at about $150 million. Local business reporting later linked this acquisition period to CECO’s shift of its headquarters presence from the Cincinnati area to the Dallas region.

In January 2023, CECO acquired UK-based noise control systems manufacturer Wakefield Acoustics Ltd. Later in 2023, the company acquired Transcend Solutions, a Houston-based process filtration solutions firm. In September 2023, World Pumps reported CECO’s acquisition of Kemco Systems, an industrial water recycling and energy conservation business headquartered in Pinellas Park, Florida.

In December 2024, CECO acquired Verantis Environmental Solutions Group, which the company described in its SEC filings as an engineering services and equipment systems provider focused on exhaust air treatment for industrial and high technology manufacturing processes. In early 2025, CECO completed its acquisition of Profire Energy in an all-cash transaction at $2.55 per share, described by Nasdaq as totaling approximately $125 million.

=== Thermon Group acquisition ===
In February 2026, CECO Environmental entered into an agreement to acquire Thermon Group Holdings, a Houston-based industrial process heating and thermal management company, in a cash-and-stock transaction valued at approximately $2.2 billion. Manufacturing Dive described Thermon as a maker of heat tracing cables, boilers, and other industrial equipment, and reported that the combination would expand CECO's portfolio beyond air pollution control, fluid handling, and filtration equipment.

The transaction closed on June 1, 2026. According to CECO's Form 8-K filed with the U.S. Securities and Exchange Commission, Thermon became a wholly owned subsidiary of CECO before merging into a surviving entity renamed Thermon Group Holdings, LLC. CECO issued approximately 22.53 million shares of common stock and paid approximately $329.4 million in aggregate cash consideration to former Thermon shareholders.
