= Utah State Route 74 =

State highway in Utah, United States

State Route 74
- Alpine Highway

Route information
- Maintained by UDOT
- Length: 5.058 mi (8.140 km)
- Existed: 1935–present

Major junctions
- South end: US 89 in American Fork
- SR-92 in Highland
- North end: Canyon Crest Road in Alpine

Location
- Country: United States
- State: Utah

Highway system
- Utah State Highway System; Interstate; US; State; Minor; Scenic
| ← SR-73 | → SR-75 |

State Route 74 (SR-74)—also called Alpine Highway—is a state highway in the U.S. state of Utah. It is 5 miles (8.0 km) long, and connects the cities of American Fork and Alpine in northern Utah County.

== Route description ==
The route's southern end is at the intersection of US-89 (Main Street) and 100 East in American Fork. From here it proceeds north as Alpine Highway. After about 1 mile (1.6 km), the route turns to a more north-northwestern direction, passing two golf courses as it enters the city of Highland. Here it intersects SR-92 (Timpanogos Highway), and continues another 1.2 miles (1.9 km), enters the city of Alpine and terminates 200 feet (61 m) south of Canyon Crest Road.

== History ==
The route was established as a state highway May 12, 1931. It was originally planned as part of SR-71, but that route was shortened and the section from Alpine to American Fork was redesignated as SR-74 in 1935. For over 70 years, the route alignment remained essentially the same, with only minor legislative description changes. In 1953 the southern end was defined as the intersection with SR-1 (historic US-91). In 1965, SR-8 (the old designation for US-6) was extended north to Lehi, and SR-74's description was amended to terminate at this intersection. In 1969, SR-8 was separated from US-6, leaving just the section from Moark Junction north to Lehi, with SR-8 being deleted altogether in 1977 and that stretch being assigned to route 89. SR-74's description was updated accordingly to reflect the numbering change. All through this, the route remained essentially unchanged, until 2003, when the northernmost 0.6 miles (0.97 km) was removed from the highway system and transferred to the city of Alpine.

== Major intersections ==
The entire route is in Utah County.

| Location | mi | km | Destinations | Notes |
|---|---|---|---|---|
| American Fork | 0.000 | 0.000 | US 89 (Main Street) | Southern terminus |
| Highland | 3.896 | 6.270 | SR-92 (Timpanogos Highway) | |
| Alpine | 5.058 | 8.140 | 200 feet south of Canyon Crest Road | Northern terminus |
1.000 mi = 1.609 km; 1.000 km = 0.621 mi
