= Alpine, Utah =

- City
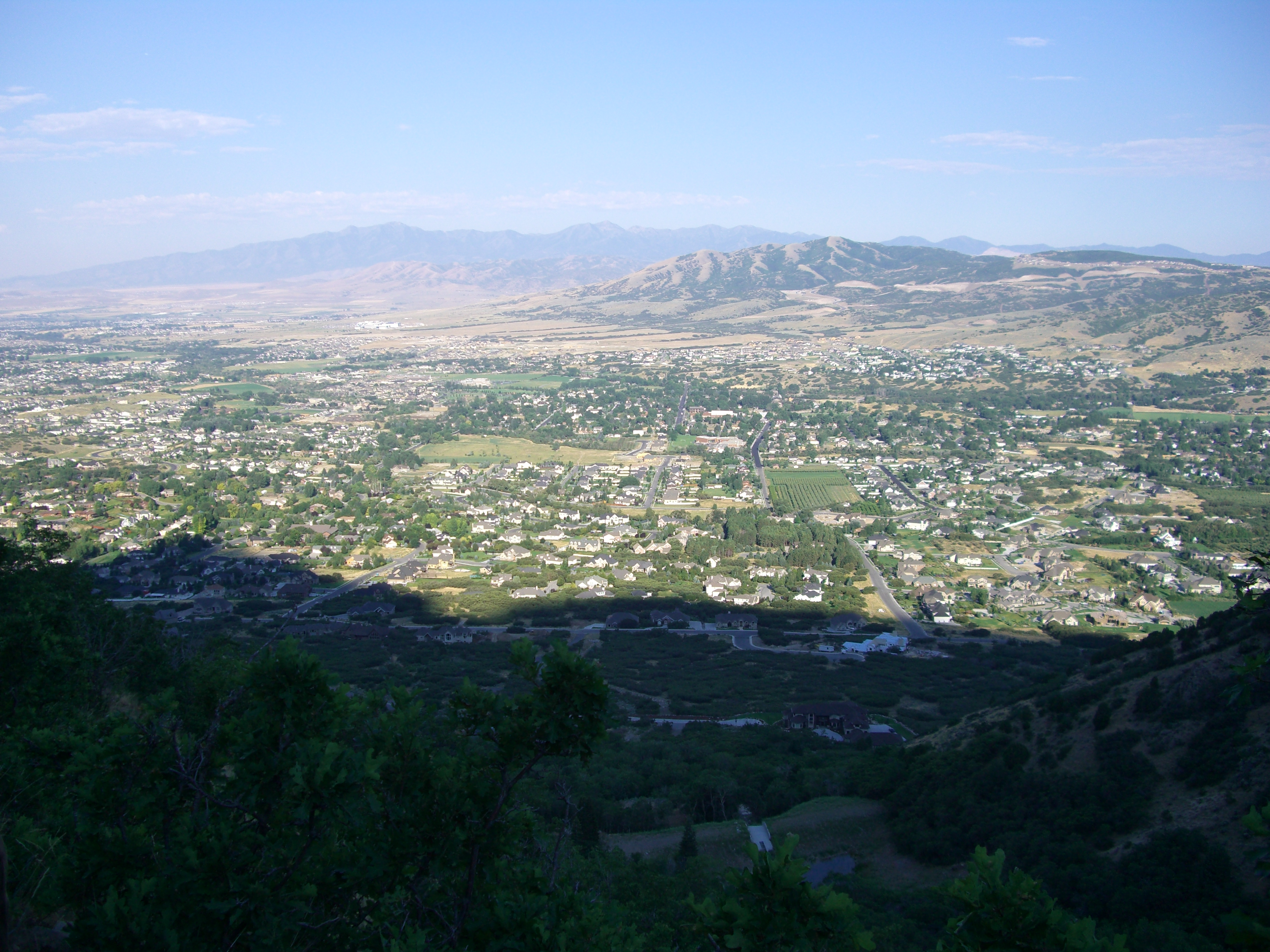
- Overlooking Alpine

- Location in Utah County and the state of Utah

- Location in the United States
- Coordinates: 40°27′23″N 111°45′25″W
- Country: United States
- State: Utah
- County: Utah
- Settled: 1850
- Incorporated: January 19, 1855

Area
  - Total: 7.95 sq mi (20.60 km^{2})
  - Land: 7.95 sq mi (20.60 km^{2})
  - Water: 0 sq mi (0.00 km^{2})
- Elevation: 5,049 ft (1,539 m)

Population (2020)
  - Total: 10,251
  - Density: 1,319.7/sq mi (509.55/km^{2})
- Time zone: UTC-7 (MST)
  - Summer (DST): UTC-6 (MDT)
- ZIP code: 84004
- Area codes: 385, 801
- FIPS code: 49-00540
- GNIS feature ID: 2409686
- Website: City of Alpine

Alpine is a city on the northeastern edge of Utah County, Utah, United States. The population was 10,251 at the time of the 2020 census. Alpine has been one of the many quickly-growing cities of Utah since the 1970s, especially in the 1990s. This city is thirty-two miles southeast of Salt Lake City. It is located on the slopes of the Wasatch Range north of Highland and American Fork. The west side of the city runs above the Wasatch Fault.

== History ==
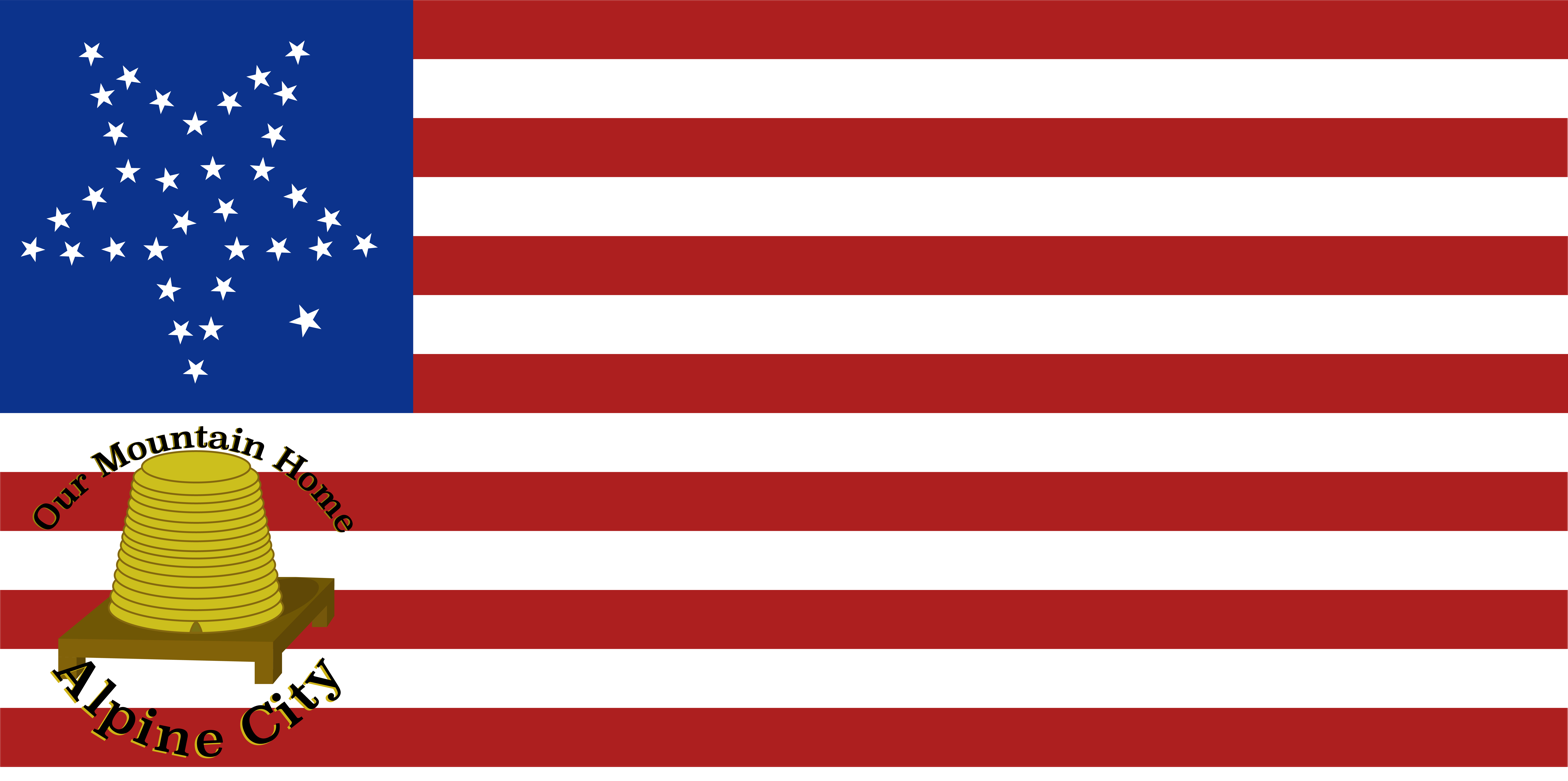
Digital reconstruction of the city flag, c1860s

The area, which would one day become Alpine, was settled by William Wordsworth and several other homesteading families in the fall of 1850. The town was originally called Mountainville, and under the latter name settlement was first made in 1851. The city was renamed because the views from the elevated town site were compared to the Swiss Alps. In the 1860s Mrs. Joseph Walton made a flag to represent the city. The flag was carried across the county, it flew for 40 years.

== Geography ==
Alpine is located on State Route 74, just north of the city of Highland.

According to the United States Census Bureau, the city has a total area of 7.4 square miles (19.2 km^{2}). None of that area is covered with water, although several small mountain streams run through the city for years with sufficient rainfall.

There are several mountain biking trails around the city that attract bikers from all over the state. There are also many trails and paths well suited for back-trail hiking along the mountains. The nearby American Fork Canyon offers camping, swimming, and access to mountaineering regions around Mount Timpanogos.

The hills surrounding Alpine have been affected by several brush fires in recent years, the most devastating of which was the Quail Fire, which consumed over 2200 acres on the north-east side of town in July 2012. The area is serviced by the Lone Peak Fire Department and Lone Peak Police Force.

=== Climate ===
Climate data for Alpine, Utah, 1991–2020 normals, extremes 1965–present
Month	Jan	Feb	Mar	Apr	May	Jun	Jul	Aug	Sep	Oct	Nov	Dec	Year
Record high °F (°C)	61 (16)	70 (21)	79 (26)	87 (31)	93 (34)	100 (38)	104 (40)	105 (41)	98 (37)	89 (32)	75 (24)	66 (19)	105 (41)
Mean maximum °F (°C)	52.3 (11.3)	58.6 (14.8)	70.2 (21.2)	77.5 (25.3)	85.6 (29.8)	93.3 (34.1)	96.4 (35.8)	94.4 (34.7)	89.6 (32.0)	79.7 (26.5)	67.1 (19.5)	54.8 (12.7)	97.0 (36.1)
Mean daily maximum °F (°C)	38.6 (3.7)	44.0 (6.7)	54.4 (12.4)	60.9 (16.1)	70.6 (21.4)	82.2 (27.9)	89.5 (31.9)	87.3 (30.7)	78.6 (25.9)	65.1 (18.4)	50.2 (10.1)	38.5 (3.6)	63.3 (17.4)
Daily mean °F (°C)	30.1 (−1.1)	34.5 (1.4)	43.1 (6.2)	48.8 (9.3)	57.2 (14.0)	66.8 (19.3)	74.0 (23.3)	72.4 (22.4)	63.7 (17.6)	51.9 (11.1)	39.8 (4.3)	30.2 (−1.0)	51.0 (10.6)
Mean daily minimum °F (°C)	21.6 (−5.8)	24.9 (−3.9)	31.8 (−0.1)	36.8 (2.7)	43.9 (6.6)	51.4 (10.8)	58.5 (14.7)	57.6 (14.2)	48.9 (9.4)	38.8 (3.8)	29.4 (−1.4)	21.9 (−5.6)	38.8 (3.8)
Mean minimum °F (°C)	5.9 (−14.5)	9.4 (−12.6)	17.6 (−8.0)	24.2 (−4.3)	30.8 (−0.7)	38.8 (3.8)	49.5 (9.7)	47.9 (8.8)	35.8 (2.1)	25.1 (−3.8)	14.0 (−10.0)	6.2 (−14.3)	1.9 (−16.7)
Record low °F (°C)	−15 (−26)	−20 (−29)	5 (−15)	12 (−11)	24 (−4)	30 (−1)	39 (4)	32 (0)	25 (−4)	8 (−13)	−1 (−18)	−7 (−22)	−20 (−29)
Average precipitation inches (mm)	2.50 (64)	2.03 (52)	2.03 (52)	2.49 (63)	2.42 (61)	1.00 (25)	0.64 (16)	0.95 (24)	1.33 (34)	1.84 (47)	1.63 (41)	2.26 (57)	21.12 (536)
Average snowfall inches (cm)	17.4 (44)	13.6 (35)	9.6 (24)	6.2 (16)	0.5 (1.3)	0.0 (0.0)	0.0 (0.0)	0.0 (0.0)	0.0 (0.0)	1.6 (4.1)	8.0 (20)	17.5 (44)	74.4 (189)
Average precipitation days (≥ 0.01 in)	10.1	9.2	9.1	10.2	9.2	4.9	4.3	6.2	5.9	7.2	7.4	9.3	93.0
Average snowy days (≥ 0.1 in)	6.2	5.4	3.8	2.5	0.4	0.0	0.0	0.0	0.0	0.9	3.3	6.7	29.2
Source: NOAA

== Demographics ==
Historical population
Census	Pop.	Note	%±
1860	135		—
1870	208		54.1%
1880	319		53.4%
1890	466		46.1%
1900	520		11.6%
1910	585		12.5%
1920	470		−19.7%
1930	509		8.3%
1940	444		−12.8%
1950	571		28.6%
1960	775		35.7%
1970	1,047		35.1%
1980	2,649		153.0%
1990	3,492		31.8%
2000	7,146		104.6%
2010	9,555		33.7%
2020	10,251		7.3%
U.S. Decennial Census

Alpine is part of the Provo–Orem metropolitan area.

=== 2020 census ===
As of the 2020 census, Alpine had a population of 10,251, and the population density was 1,319.67 people per square mile (383.2/km^{2}). The median age was 31.8 years, with 31.2% of residents under the age of 18 and 12.6% aged 65 or older. For every 100 females there were 100.6 males, and for every 100 females age 18 and over there were 99.3 males age 18 and over.

There were 2,699 households in Alpine, of which 46.2% had children under the age of 18 living in them. Of all households, 81.3% were married-couple households, 6.3% were households with a male householder and no spouse or partner present, and 11.8% were households with a female householder and no spouse or partner present. About 9.2% of all households were made up of individuals and 5.7% had someone living alone who was 65 years of age or older.

There were 2,783 housing units, of which 3.0% were vacant. The homeowner vacancy rate was 0.6% and the rental vacancy rate was 3.2%.

95.8% of residents lived in urban areas, while 4.2% lived in rural areas.

Racial composition as of the 2020 census
Race	Number	Percent
White	9,454	92.2%
Black or African American	42	0.4%
American Indian and Alaska Native	20	0.2%
Asian	95	0.9%
Native Hawaiian and Other Pacific Islander	26	0.3%
Some other race	105	1.0%
Two or more races	509	5.0%
Hispanic or Latino (of any race)	391	3.8%

== Government ==
The mayor of Alpine is Carla Merrill. The members of the City Council are Jessica Smuin, Lon Lott, Kelli Law, Jason Thelin, and Greg Gordon. Alpine City Hall, located at the intersection of Main St. and Center St, celebrated the 80th anniversary of its construction in 2016.

Alpine is part of Utah's 3rd congressional district, represented by Republican Mike Kennedy.

== Education ==
Despite being a fairly small city, Alpine is home to five schools. Three of the schools are a part of the Alpine School District, while the fourth, Mountainville Academy, is a charter school for grades K-9. Alpine Elementary and Westfield Elementary are Alpine District Schools for grades K-6. The Alpine District elementary schools feed into Timberline Middle School, a 7–9 grade school. The Montessori Canyon Academy was founded by Michelle Kerr in 2014 and offers private preschool education.

== Points of interest ==
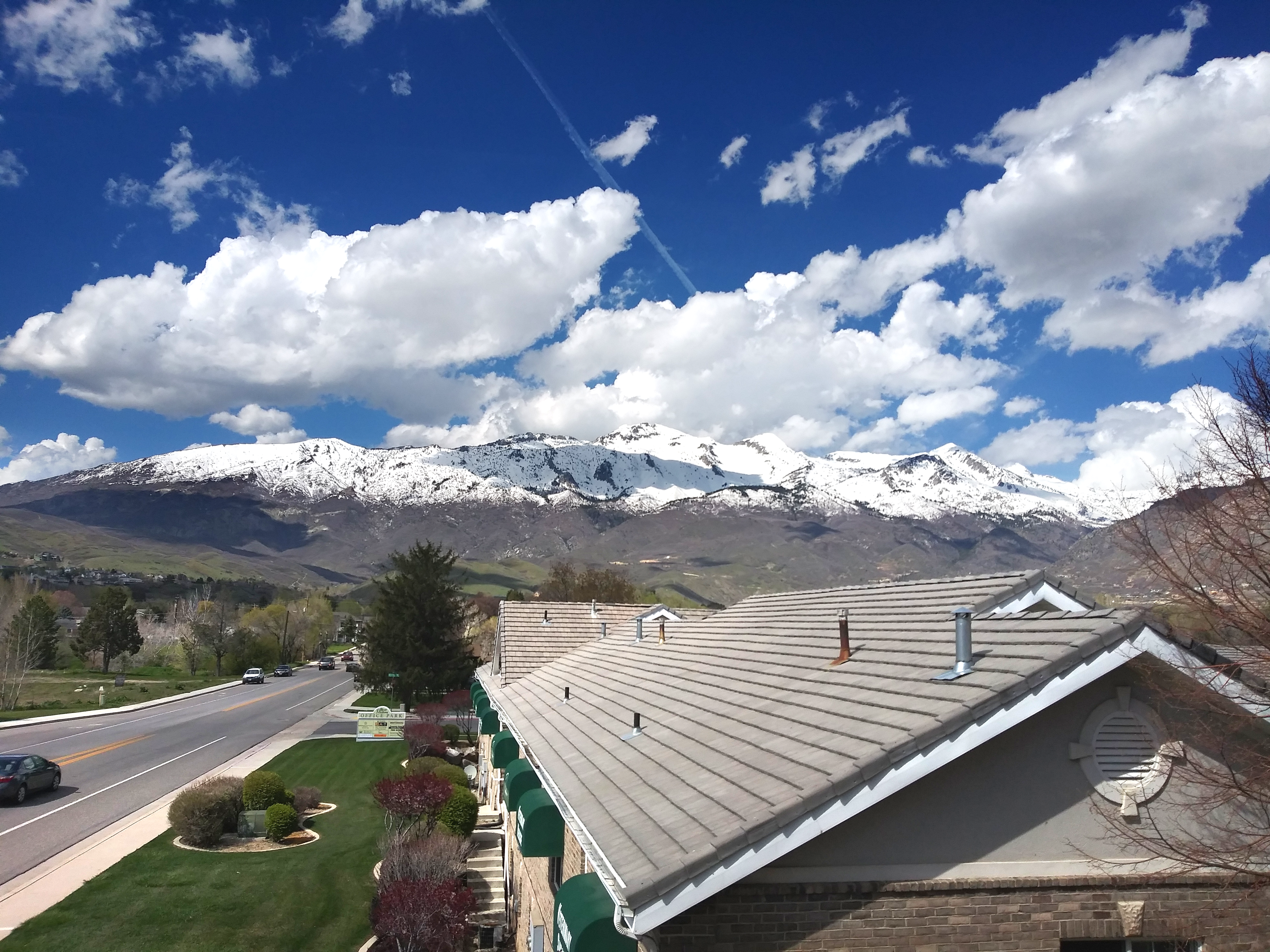
Lone Peak and White Baldy, as seen from downtown Alpine.

- Burgess Park
- Creekside Park (100 South Park)
- Historic Moyle Park
- Horsetail Falls (Dry Creek Trail)
- Petersen Arboretum
- Sliding Rock
- American Fork Canyon (Alpine Scenic Highway)
- Tibble Fork Reservoir and Silver Lake Flat

== Notable people ==
- William Grant Bangerter, religious authority
- Julie B. Beck, religious leader
- Jason Chaffetz, former congressman
- Frank Jackson, basketball player
- Josh James, entrepreneur
- Lee Johnson, football player
- Mike Kennedy, U.S. congressman
- Rick Koerber, convicted fraudster
- Mike Lee, U.S. senator
- Bronco Mendenhall, football coach
- Dale Murphy, baseball player
- Lloyd Newell, broadcaster and author
- Orrin Olsen, football player
- Anita Stansfield, novelist
- May Booth Talmage, religious leader
- Celestia Taylor, professor
- The 5 Browns, music group

== See also ==
- List of cities and towns in Utah
