= Cedar Hills, Utah =

City in Utah, United States

- City
- Location in Utah County and the state of Utah
- Coordinates: 40°24′46″N 111°45′07″W
- Country: United States
- State: Utah
- County: Utah
- Founded: 1974
- Incorporated (town): November 2, 1977
- Incorporated (city): July 22, 1999
- Named for: Juniper ("cedar") trees

Area
  - Total: 2.73 sq mi (7.06 km^{2})
  - Land: 2.73 sq mi (7.06 km^{2})
  - Water: 0 sq mi (0.00 km^{2})
- Elevation: 4,935 ft (1,504 m)

Population (2020)
  - Total: 10,019
  - Density: 3,680/sq mi (1,420/km^{2})
- Time zone: UTC-7 (Mountain (MST))
  - Summer (DST): UTC-6 (MDT)
- ZIP code: 84062
- Area codes: 385, 801
- FIPS code: 49-11440
- GNIS feature ID: 2409417
- Website: www.cedarhills.org

Cedar Hills is a city in north-central Utah County, Utah, United States. The population was 10,019 at the 2020 census, up from 9,796 in 2010. The city began growing rapidly during the 1990s and is located east of Alpine and Highland on the slopes of Mount Timpanogos.

== Geography ==
According to the United States Census Bureau, the city has a total area of 2.7 square miles (7.1 km^{2}), all land.

== Demographics ==
Historical population
Census	Pop.	Note	%±
1980	571		—
1990	769		34.7%
2000	3,094		302.3%
2010	9,796		216.6%
2020	10,019		2.3%
U.S. Decennial Census

=== 2020 census ===
As of the 2020 census, Cedar Hills had a population of 10,019. The median age was 27.7 years. 35.9% of residents were under the age of 18 and 8.8% of residents were 65 years of age or older. For every 100 females there were 97.7 males, and for every 100 females age 18 and over there were 96.7 males age 18 and over.

99.6% of residents lived in urban areas, while 0.4% lived in rural areas.

There were 2,536 households in Cedar Hills, of which 56.6% had children under the age of 18 living in them. Of all households, 79.6% were married-couple households, 5.7% were households with a male householder and no spouse or partner present, and 13.5% were households with a female householder and no spouse or partner present. About 8.7% of all households were made up of individuals and 5.3% had someone living alone who was 65 years of age or older.

There were 2,590 housing units, of which 2.1% were vacant. The homeowner vacancy rate was 0.5% and the rental vacancy rate was 2.5%.

Racial composition as of the 2020 census
Race	Number	Percent
White	8,877	88.6%
Black or African American	23	0.2%
American Indian and Alaska Native	31	0.3%
Asian	115	1.1%
Native Hawaiian and Other Pacific Islander	81	0.8%
Some other race	139	1.4%
Two or more races	753	7.5%
Hispanic or Latino (of any race)	702	7.0%

=== 2000 census ===
As of the 2000 census there were 3,094 people, 695 households, and 658 families residing in the town. The population density was 1,573.3 inhabitants per square mile (606.4/km^{2}). There were 721 housing units at an average density of 366.6 per square mile (141.3/km^{2}). The racial makeup of the town was 97.09% White, 0.10% African American, 0.29% Native American, 0.52% Asian, 0.19% Pacific Islander, 0.52% from other races, and 1.29% from two or more races. Hispanic or Latino of any race were 1.94% of the population.

There were 695 households, out of which 76.8% had children under 18 living with them, 89.1% were married couples living together, 4.3% had a female householder with no husband present, and 5.3% were non-families. 4.9% of all households were made up of individuals, and 1.4% had someone living alone who was 65 years or older. The average household size was 4.44, and the average family size was 4.58.

Cedar Hills has many children, with 49.0% of the population under 18, 7.2% from 18 to 24, 30.4% from 25 to 44, 10.4% from 45 to 64, and 3.0% who were 65 years of age or older. The median age was 18 years. For every 100 females, there were 101.4 males. For every 100 females aged 18 and over, there were 96.6 males.

The median income for a household in the town was $62,688, and the median income for a family was $63,625. Males had a median income of $52,813 versus $32,708 for females. The per capita income was $16,319. About 3.8% of families and 4.5% of the population were below the poverty line, including 5.1% of those under age 18 and 5.7% of those aged 65 or over.

== Education ==
Cedar Hills public schools are part of the Alpine School District and include access to multiple schools: two senior high schools, Lone Peak High School and American Fork High School in neighboring Highland City and American Fork; two junior high schools, Mountain Ridge Junior High and Timberline Middle School in neighboring Highland City and Alpine City; and two elementary schools within the city, Cedar Ridge and Deerfield.

== Businesses ==
The city's current business license ordinance indicates the requirements and any restrictions in operating a home occupation business, as well as other types of businesses.

== Notable people ==
- Ben Cahoon, football player and coach
- Zackery Farnsworth, soccer player
- Chad Lewis, football player

== City ordinances ==
As the bedroom community grew and the prospect of businesses locating in Cedar Hills loomed, there was a dispute as to whether stores should be allowed to open on Sunday and whether alcohol should be allowed to be sold. This was due to a large majority of the city's residents being members of the Church of Jesus Christ of Latter-day Saints, but it was resolved in 2005 when a referendum vote on two initiatives (one prohibiting businesses from being open on Sunday and the other prohibiting selling alcohol) were defeated. The anchor business for the commercial center, Walmart, opened in 2009 and remains open on Sundays and sells beer.

== See also ==
- List of cities and towns in Utah
