= Lindon, Utah =

City in Utah, United States

- City
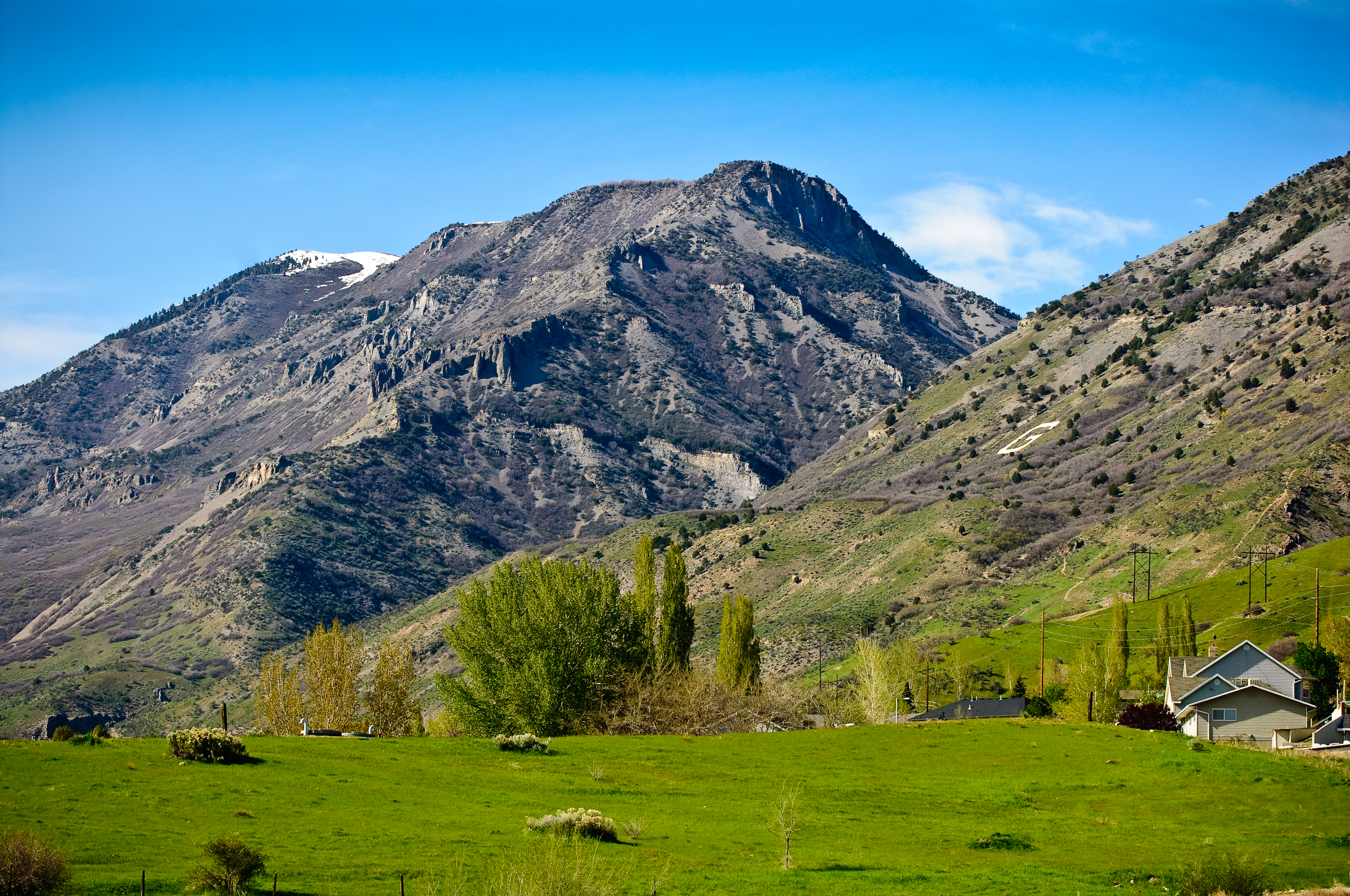
- The Wasatch mountain range north of Lindon

- Location in Utah County and the state of Utah
- Coordinates: 40°20′26″N 111°44′28″W
- Country: United States
- State: Utah
- County: Utah
- Settled: 1850
- Incorporated: March 24, 1924
- Named for: Linden tree

Area
  - Total: 8.54 sq mi (22.11 km^{2})
  - Land: 8.35 sq mi (21.63 km^{2})
  - Water: 0.19 sq mi (0.48 km^{2})
- Elevation: 4,666 ft (1,422 m)

Population (2020)
  - Total: 11,397
  - Density: 1,365/sq mi (526.9/km^{2})
- Time zone: UTC-7 (Mountain (MST))
  - Summer (DST): UTC-6 (MDT)
- ZIP code: 84042
- Area code: 801
- FIPS code: 49-45090
- GNIS feature ID: 2410838
- Website: lindon.gov

Lindon is a city in Utah County, Utah, United States. It is part of the Provo-Orem metropolitan area. The population was 11,397 at the 2020 census.

== History ==
Originally settled in 1861, Lindon began as pioneers moved into what was then the Lindon grazing land. The town was originally named "String Town" because of the way the houses were strung up and down the street between the towns of Orem and Pleasant Grove. An old linden tree (Tilia) growing in town in 1901 inspired the present (misspelled) name. Over the past century Lindon has seen organized development, but it has tried to remain true to its motto: "Lindon: a little bit of country".

== Historical sites ==
Gillman Farm
James Henry Gillman bought 10 acres (4 ha) of land late in the 19th century. Now, over a hundred years later, four generations of the Gillman family have restored and still work the land today. The Gillman Farm has been identified as one of Utah's "Century Farms."

Lindon Cider Mill
Built by Lewis Robison in 1857, the Lindon Cider Mill provided cider for city residents every fall and winter. Later in the summer residents would use the aged cider as vinegar. Today the cider mill stands with its original honeycomb limestone that was quarried from American Fork Canyon.

Alfred Harper House
Originally constructed in 1876, the "Big House" as it was called was built with honeycomb limestone from the American Fork Canyon. Alfred Harper built the house before leaving for New Zealand on a three-year mission for the LDS Church. On his return he finished the home and planted vines that in time have grown over the house. The only property in Lindon listed on the National Register of Historic Places.

Lindon Ward Chapel
The Lindon Ward Chapel was built by early LDS members who settled in Lindon in the late 19th century. The chapel was dedicated in 1891 by Reed Smoot, a member of the quorum of the twelve apostles of the Church of Jesus Christ of Latter-day Saints. Today, the original iron fence and pine trees remain where the church once stood.

Lindon Elementary School
On the Corner of Main Street and Center Street the Lindon Elementary school was built for $5,200 in 1900. After being annexed by the Pleasant Grove School District until it was torn down in 1966. A new school was constructed for $510,000 in November 1967.

Geneva Resort
Captain John Dallin named the resort after his daughter in 1890. He also constructed a boat harbor, several wells, and a dance pavilion, a hotel and concession stands.

Joseph Wadley Farm
In 1881, Joseph Wadley began quarrying and hauling tufa rock from Pleasant Grove. He constructed the home on his 32 acres (12.9 ha) of land on Lindon Hill in 1882. In 1988 the land was purchased by his grandson and restored to its original state.

The Amusement Hall
Constructed in 1900, it was built in the shape of a "T" with rustic lumber. The hall was used for three-act plays, silent films, and dancing until it was converted to a cannery in 1940.

=== Memorial sites ===
Pioneer Home
A restored home from the original settlers that came into the Lindon herding grounds in 1861.

Lindon City Veteran's Memorial
This memorial recognizes those who have fought and died in 20th century wars. The memorial contains photos and biographies of those who have given their lives in defense of this country.

== Geography ==
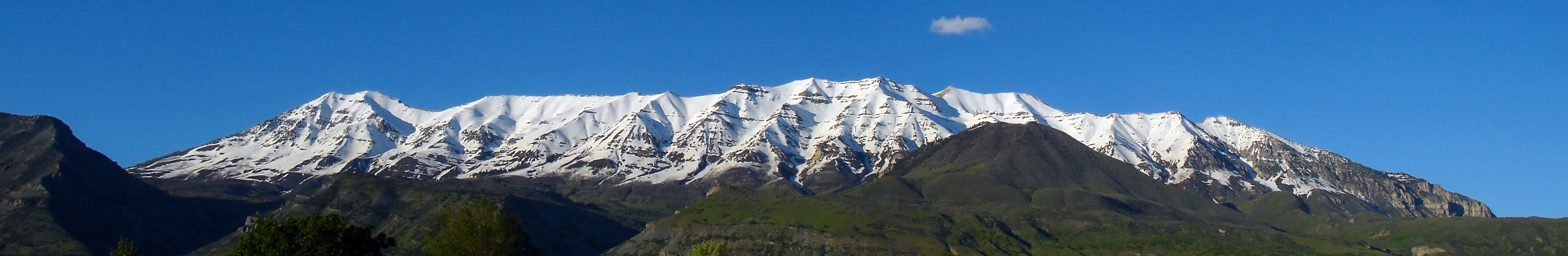
Mount Timpanogos sits nearby northeast of Lindon.

According to the United States Census Bureau, the city has a total area of 8.6 square miles (22 km^{2}), of which 8.4 square miles (22 km^{2}) is land and 0.2 square miles (0.52 km^{2}) (2.21%) is water.

== Demographics ==
Historical population
Census	Pop.	Note	%±
1930	589		—
1940	587		−0.3%
1950	801		36.5%
1960	1,150		43.6%
1970	1,644		43.0%
1980	2,796		70.1%
1990	3,818		36.6%
2000	8,363		119.0%
2010	10,070		20.4%
2020	11,397		13.2%
U.S. Decennial Census

=== 2020 census ===
As of the 2020 census, Lindon had a population of 11,397. The median age was 31.0 years; 31.5% of residents were under the age of 18 and 12.2% of residents were 65 years of age or older. For every 100 females there were 101.8 males, and for every 100 females age 18 and over there were 99.9 males age 18 and over.

99.4% of residents lived in urban areas, while 0.6% lived in rural areas.

There were 3,129 households in Lindon, of which 45.9% had children under the age of 18 living in them. Of all households, 77.2% were married-couple households, 8.1% were households with a male householder and no spouse or partner present, and 13.8% were households with a female householder and no spouse or partner present. About 11.7% of all households were made up of individuals and 7.0% had someone living alone who was 65 years of age or older. There were 3,271 housing units, of which 4.3% were vacant; the homeowner vacancy rate was 0.4% and the rental vacancy rate was 4.1%.

Racial composition as of the 2020 census
Race	Number	Percent
White	9,817	86.1%
Black or African American	50	0.4%
American Indian and Alaska Native	32	0.3%
Asian	165	1.4%
Native Hawaiian and Other Pacific Islander	96	0.8%
Some other race	347	3.0%
Two or more races	890	7.8%
Hispanic or Latino (of any race)	1,025	9.0%

=== 2010 census ===
As of the census of 2010, there were 10,070 people, 2,518 households, and 2,279 families residing in the city. The population density was 1198.8 people per square mile (462.8/km^{2}). There were 2,602 housing units at an average density of 309.7 per square mile (119.5/km^{2}). The racial makeup of the city was 91.8% White, 0.5% African American, 0.4% Native American, 1.3% Asian, 0.4% Pacific Islander, 2.7% from other races, and 2.9% from two or more races. Hispanic or Latino of any race were 7.1% of the population.

There were 2,518 households, out of which 56.8% had children under the age of 18 living with them, 82.2% were married couples living together, 5.7% had a female householder with no husband present, and 9.5% were non-families. 7.9% of all households were made up of individuals, and 3.8% had someone living alone who was 65 years of age or older. The average household size was 3.97 and the average family size was 4.20.

In the city, the population was spread out, with 41.9% from 0–19, 6.9% from 20 to 24, 23.2% from 25 to 44, 20.8% from 45 to 64, and 7.5% who were 65 years of age or older. The median age was 26.3 years. For every 100 females, there were 101.3 males. For every 100 females age 20 and over, there were 98.3 males.

The median income for a household in the city was $61,964, and the median income for a family was $63,513. Males had a median income of $47,330 versus $23,158 for females. The per capita income for the city was $18,088. About 2.9% of families and 3.1% of the population were below the poverty line, including 3.7% of those under age 18 and 7.5% of those age 65 or over.

== Education ==
Lindon Public Schools are part of the Alpine School District. Sam Jarman is the superintendent of schools.

== See also ==
- List of cities and towns in Utah
