= American Fork =

American Fork may refer to:

- American Fork, Utah, a city in the US
  - American Fork (UTA station), Utah Transit Authority commuter rail station
- American Fork (river), a river that flows through the city
  - American Fork Canyon, through which the river flows
