= Timpanogos Cave Historic District =

Historic district in Utah, United States

- U.S. National Register of Historic Places
- U.S. Historic district
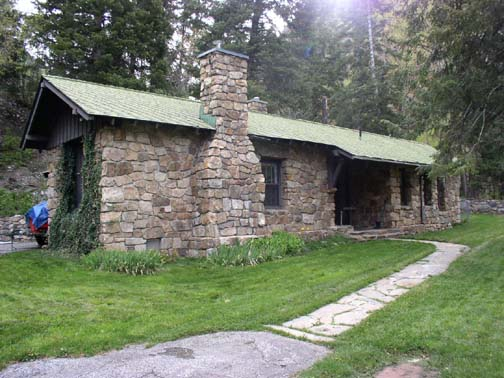
- Superintendent's residence, March 2007

- Location within Utah Location within the United States
- Nearest city: Highland, Utah
- Coordinates: 40°26′35″N 111°42′26″W
- Area: 11 acres (4.5 ha)
- Built: 1921-1941
- Architect: Multiple
- Architectural style: Rustic
- NRHP reference No.: 82001760 (original); 100012618 (increase)

Significant dates
- Added to NRHP: October 13, 1982
- Boundary increase: January 26, 2026

The Timpanogos Cave Historic District is an 11-acre (4.5 ha) historic district in the Timpanogos Cave National Monument in American Fork Canyon in northeastern Utah County, Utah, United States, that is listed on the National Register of Historic Places (NRHP).

== Description ==
The district consists of support and administration buildings built in the monument in the 1920s and 1930s. These structures are notable examples of the National Park Service Rustic style, designed to fit with their environment. The earliest trails and structures were built by Errol M. Halliday while the location was still under the administration of the U.S. Forest Service. The Old Cave Trail was built in 1921-22. The stone storage building was built in the 1920s, together with a frame custodian's residence that no longer exists. A stone confort station (Building 126) was built in 1928.

The structures are scattered on a steep landscape. The most significant building is the superintendent's residence, of rubble stone construction with a log-framed roof, covered with green shingles. The bridge is a single span built in 1935, using rubble stone. The 1935 Comfort Station restroom (presently named Last Chance restroom) is built on a ledge on the mountainside, and has a nearly flat concrete roof faced with stone. The 1928 comfort station is larger and built with a shingled roof. It is no longer used as a restroom. The rubble storage building is covered with a flat concrete roof. There are also two cold cellars on the site, both built about 1930. The trail climbs the cliffs for between one and 1.5 miles (2.4 km), its vertical climb of 1,065 feet (325 m) supported by stone retaining walls.

== History ==
The National Park Service took over the monument in 1933. Monument facilities were expanded using labor provided by the Works Progress Administration, with another comfort station (Building 127) in 1939. The unnamed stream that flows through the American Fork Canyon (and becomes the American Fork river at the mouth of the canyon) was diverted and a new bridge was built in the 1930s. The Superintendent's Residence was completed in 1941.

The Timpanogos Cave Historic District was placed on the NRHP on October 13, 1982.

== See also ==
- National Register of Historic Places listings in Utah County, Utah
