= Sunset Peak (Utah) =

Mountain in Utah, United States

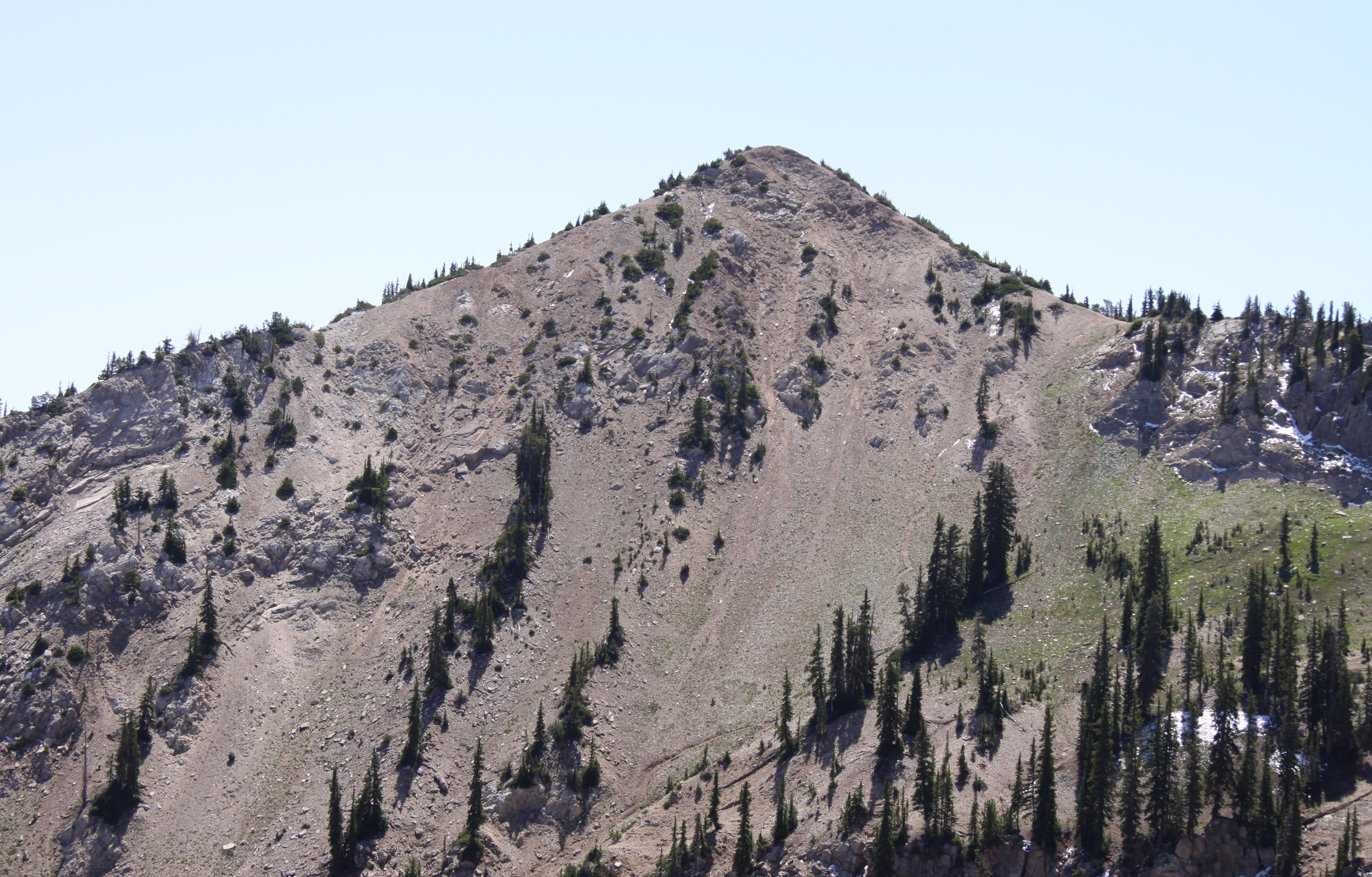
- North aspect

Highest point
- Elevation: 10,648 ft (3,246 m)
- Prominence: 228 ft (69 m)
- Parent peak: Sugarloaf Mountain
- Isolation: 0.78 mi (1.26 km)
- Coordinates: 40°34′37″N 111°35′37″W

Geography
- Location within Utah Location within the United States
- Country: United States
- State: Utah
- County: Salt Lake / Utah / Wasatch
- Parent range: Wasatch Range; Rocky Mountains
- Topo map: USGS Brighton

Climbing
- Easiest route: class 1 hiking

Sunset Peak is a 10,648-foot-elevation (3,246-meter) summit in Utah, United States.

== Description ==
Sunset Peak is located 20.5 miles (33.0 km) southeast of downtown Salt Lake City and two miles (3.2 km) south of Brighton in the Wasatch–Cache National Forest. It is set on, and in part forms, the boundary point that is shared by Salt Lake County, Utah County, and Wasatch County. The peak is set in the Wasatch Range which is a subrange of the Rocky Mountains. Precipitation runoff from the mountain's north slope drains into headwaters of Big Cottonwood Creek, whereas the east slope drains into headwaters of Snake Creek, and the south slope drains to American Fork Canyon. Topographic relief is significant as the summit rises 2,250 feet (686 meters) above Snake Creek in one mile (1.6 km). This mountain's toponym has been officially adopted by the United States Board on Geographic Names, and has been recorded in publications since at least 1915.

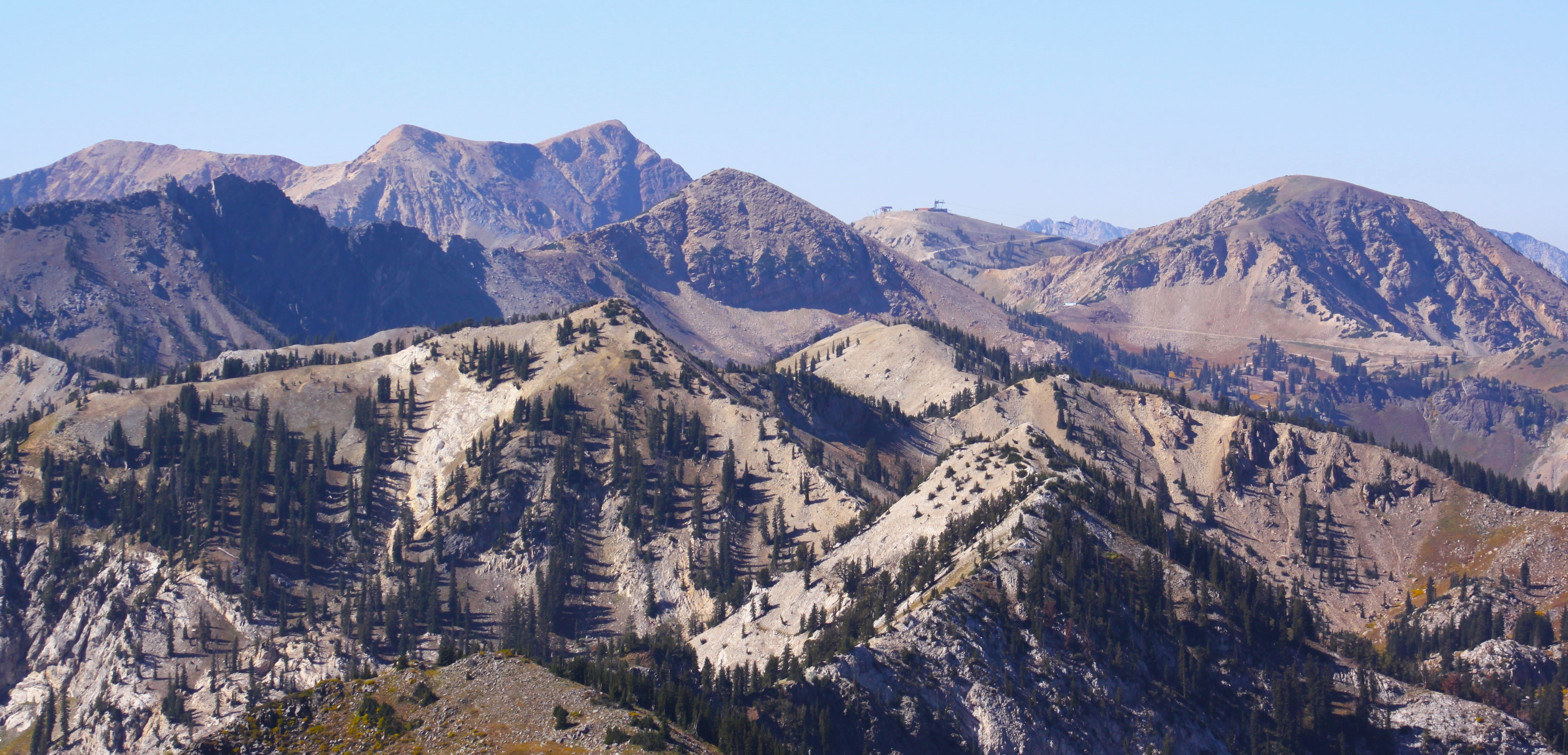
View from Clayton Peak, with Sunset Peak in front to the left, Sugarloaf Mountain (center), Twin Peaks behind left, Mount Baldy to right.

== Climate ==
Sunset Peak has a subarctic climate (Köppen Dfc), bordering on an Alpine climate (Köppen ET), with long, cold, snowy winters, and cool to warm summers. Due to its altitude, it receives precipitation all year, as snow in winter, and as thunderstorms in summer.
