= Sugarloaf Mountain (Utah) =

Mountain in Utah, United States

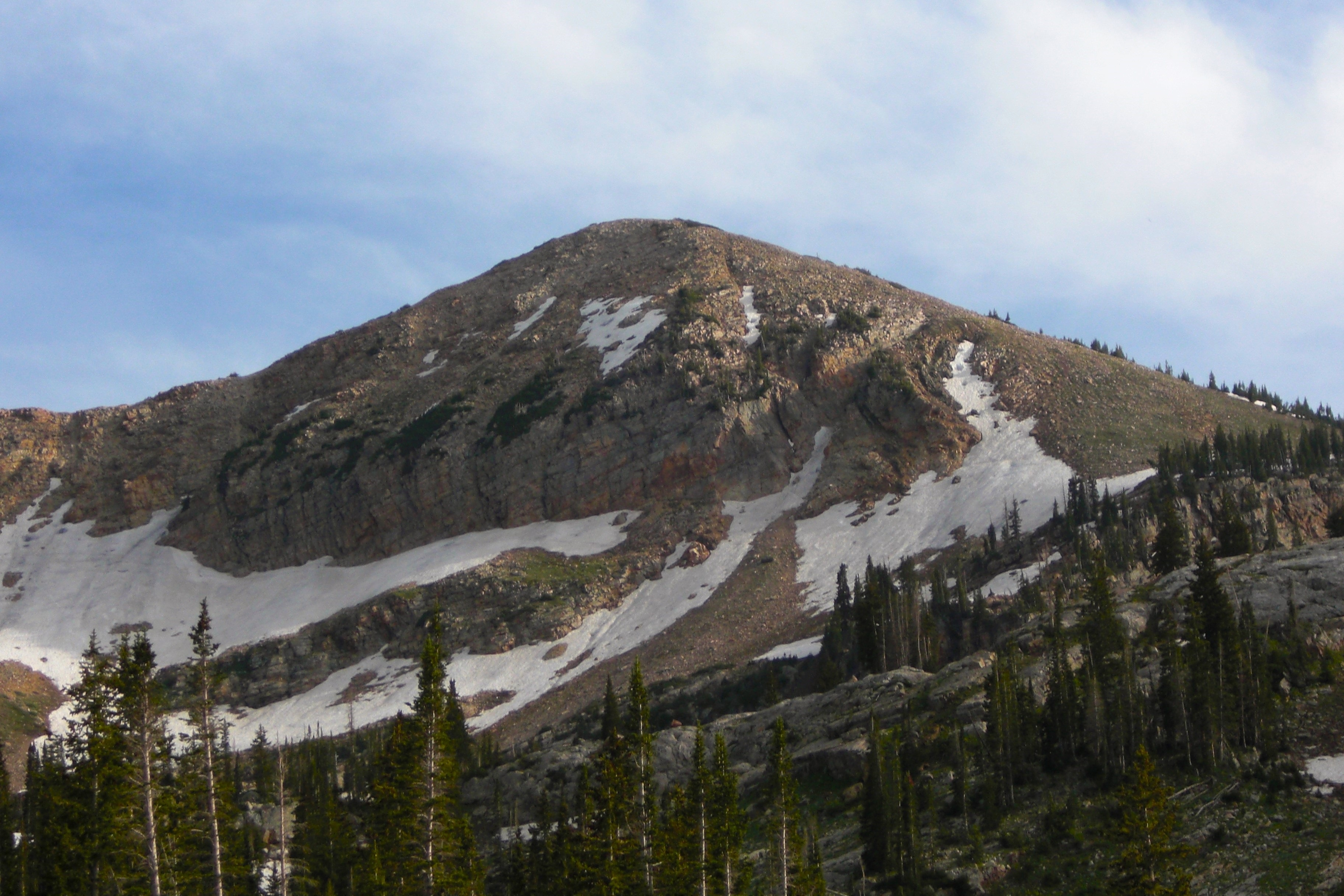
- North aspect

Highest point
- Elevation: 11,051 ft (3,368 m)
- Prominence: 551 ft (168 m)
- Parent peak: Mount Baldy
- Isolation: 0.71 mi (1.14 km)
- Coordinates: 40°33′57″N 111°37′29″W

Naming
- Etymology: Sugarloaf

Geography
- Location within Utah Location within the United States
- Country: United States
- State: Utah
- County: Salt Lake / Utah
- Parent range: Wasatch Range; Rocky Mountains
- Topo map: USGS Brighton / Dromedary Peak

Climbing
- Easiest route: class 1+ hiking

Sugarloaf Mountain is an 11,051-foot-elevation (3,368-meter) summit on the boundary that Salt Lake County shares with Utah County, in Utah, United States.

== Description ==
Sugarloaf Mountain is located 20 miles (32 km) southeast of downtown Salt Lake City at the Alta Ski Area in the Wasatch–Cache National Forest. The peak is set in the Wasatch Range which is a subset of the Rocky Mountains. Precipitation runoff from the mountain's north slope drains to Little Cottonwood Creek, whereas the south slope drains to American Fork River. Topographic relief is significant as the summit rises 2,250 feet (686 meters) above American Fork Canyon in one mile (1.6 km). This mountain's toponym has been officially adopted by the United States Board on Geographic Names.

== Climate ==
Sugarloaf Mountain has a subarctic climate (Köppen Dfc), bordering on an Alpine climate (Köppen ET), with long, cold, snowy winters, and cool to warm summers. Due to its altitude, it receives precipitation all year, as snow in winter, and as thunderstorms in summer. There is no weather station at the summit, but this climate table contains interpolated data for an area around the summit.

Climate data for Sugarloaf Mountain (Alta) 40.5641 N, 111.6236 W, Elevation: 10,482 ft (3,195 m) (1991–2020 normals)
Month	Jan	Feb	Mar	Apr	May	Jun	Jul	Aug	Sep	Oct	Nov	Dec	Year
Mean daily maximum °F (°C)	26.1 (−3.3)	27.3 (−2.6)	32.2 (0.1)	38.1 (3.4)	47.5 (8.6)	59.0 (15.0)	68.3 (20.2)	66.6 (19.2)	57.8 (14.3)	44.8 (7.1)	33.3 (0.7)	26.4 (−3.1)	44.0 (6.6)
Daily mean °F (°C)	17.9 (−7.8)	18.1 (−7.7)	22.7 (−5.2)	27.8 (−2.3)	37.0 (2.8)	47.6 (8.7)	57.1 (13.9)	55.7 (13.2)	47.3 (8.5)	35.1 (1.7)	24.8 (−4.0)	18.1 (−7.7)	34.1 (1.2)
Mean daily minimum °F (°C)	9.8 (−12.3)	8.9 (−12.8)	13.3 (−10.4)	17.6 (−8.0)	26.4 (−3.1)	36.1 (2.3)	45.9 (7.7)	44.8 (7.1)	36.7 (2.6)	25.4 (−3.7)	16.2 (−8.8)	9.8 (−12.3)	24.2 (−4.3)
Average precipitation inches (mm)	7.05 (179)	6.03 (153)	6.09 (155)	5.91 (150)	4.32 (110)	1.95 (50)	1.32 (34)	2.11 (54)	2.83 (72)	4.13 (105)	5.18 (132)	6.08 (154)	53 (1,348)
Source: PRISM Climate Group

== Gallery ==
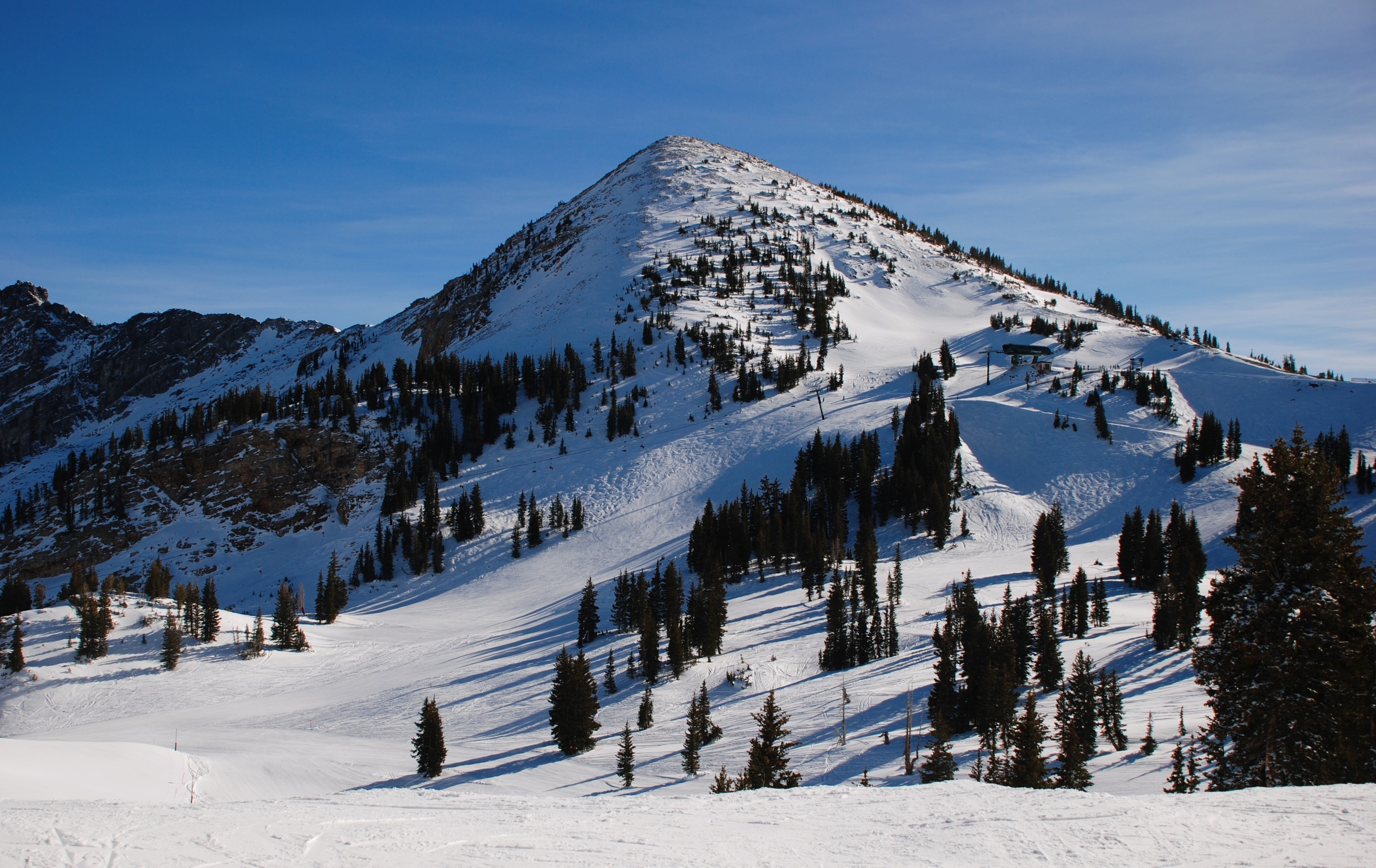
Northwest aspect

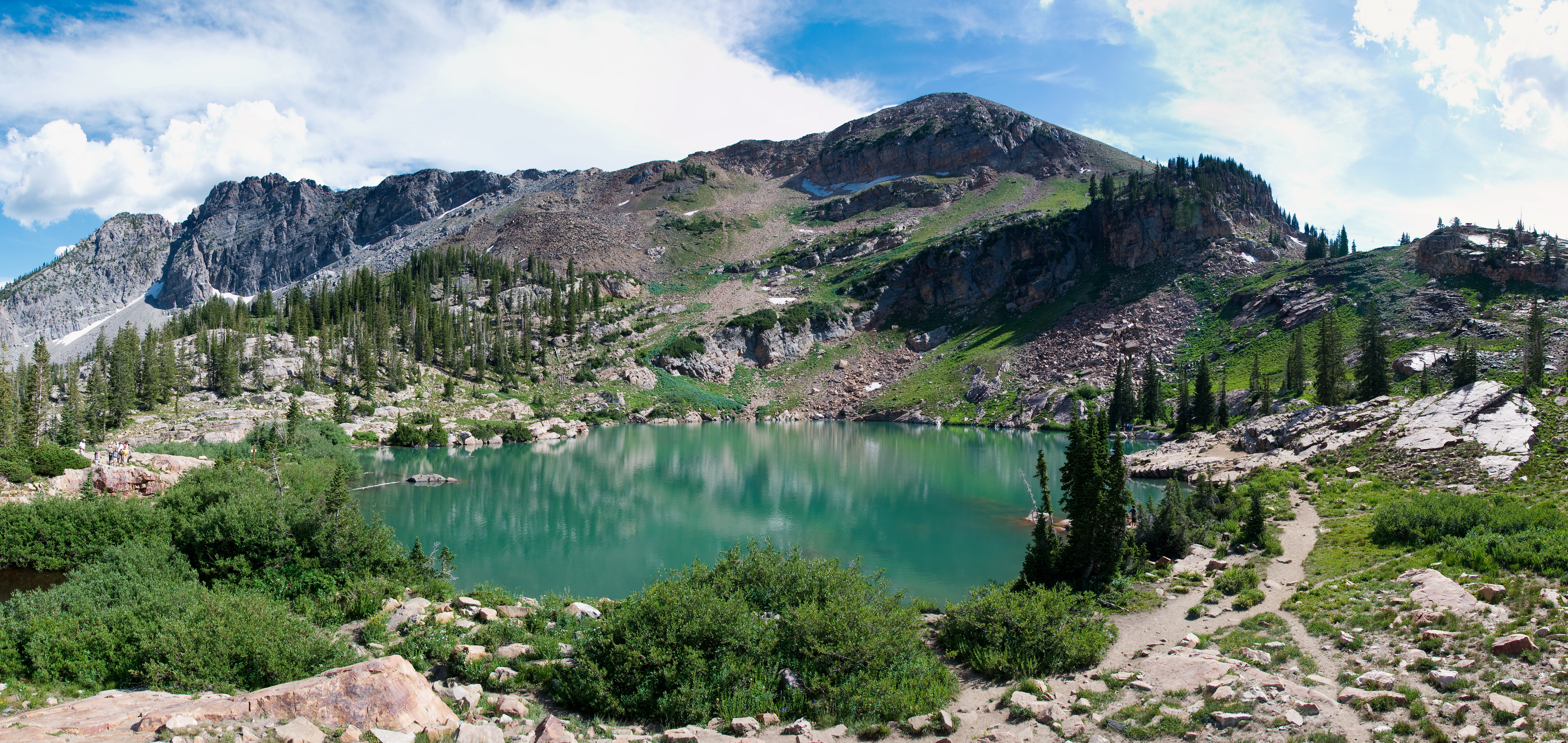
Sugarloaf Mountain and Cecret Lake

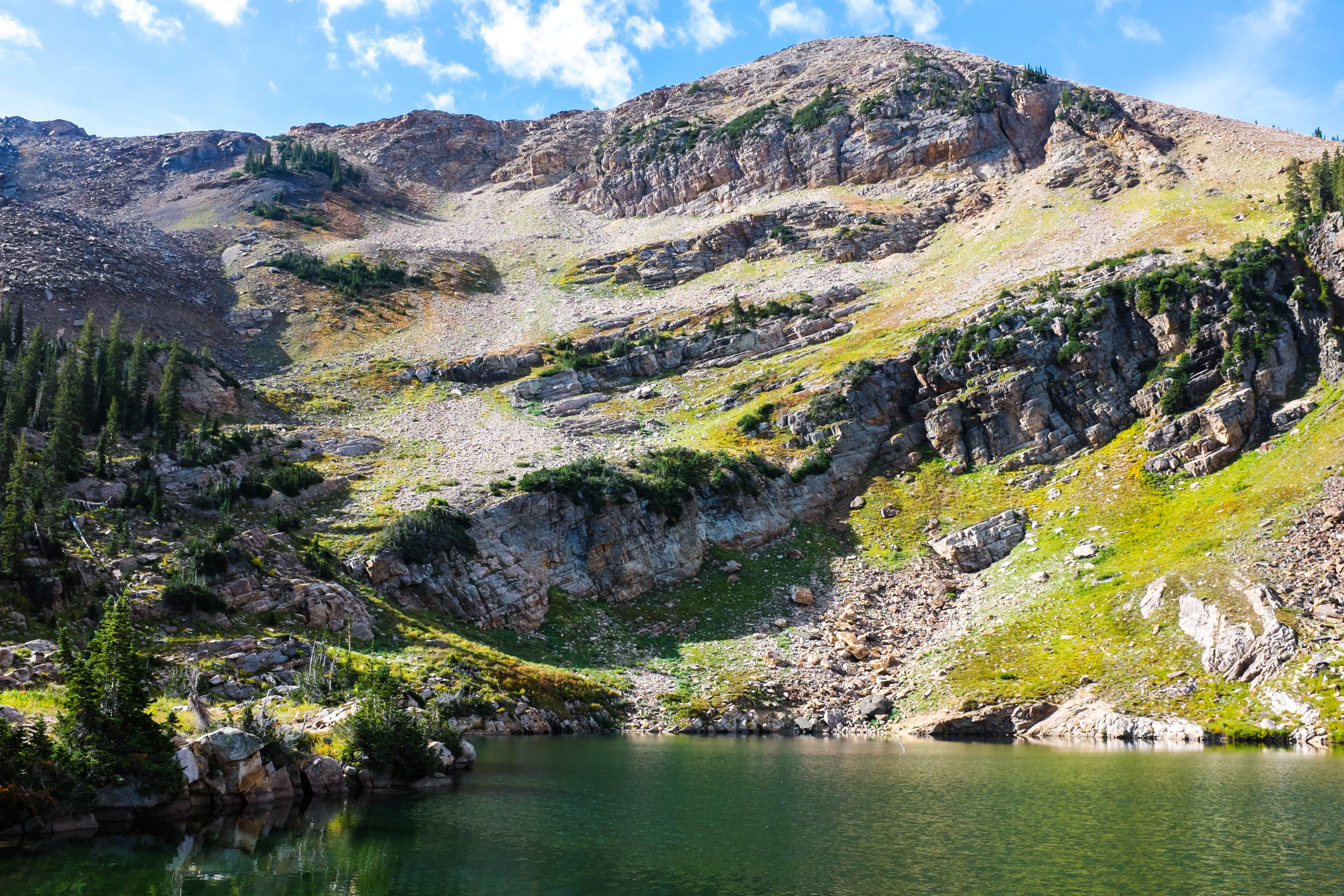
Sugarloaf Mountain and Cecret Lake

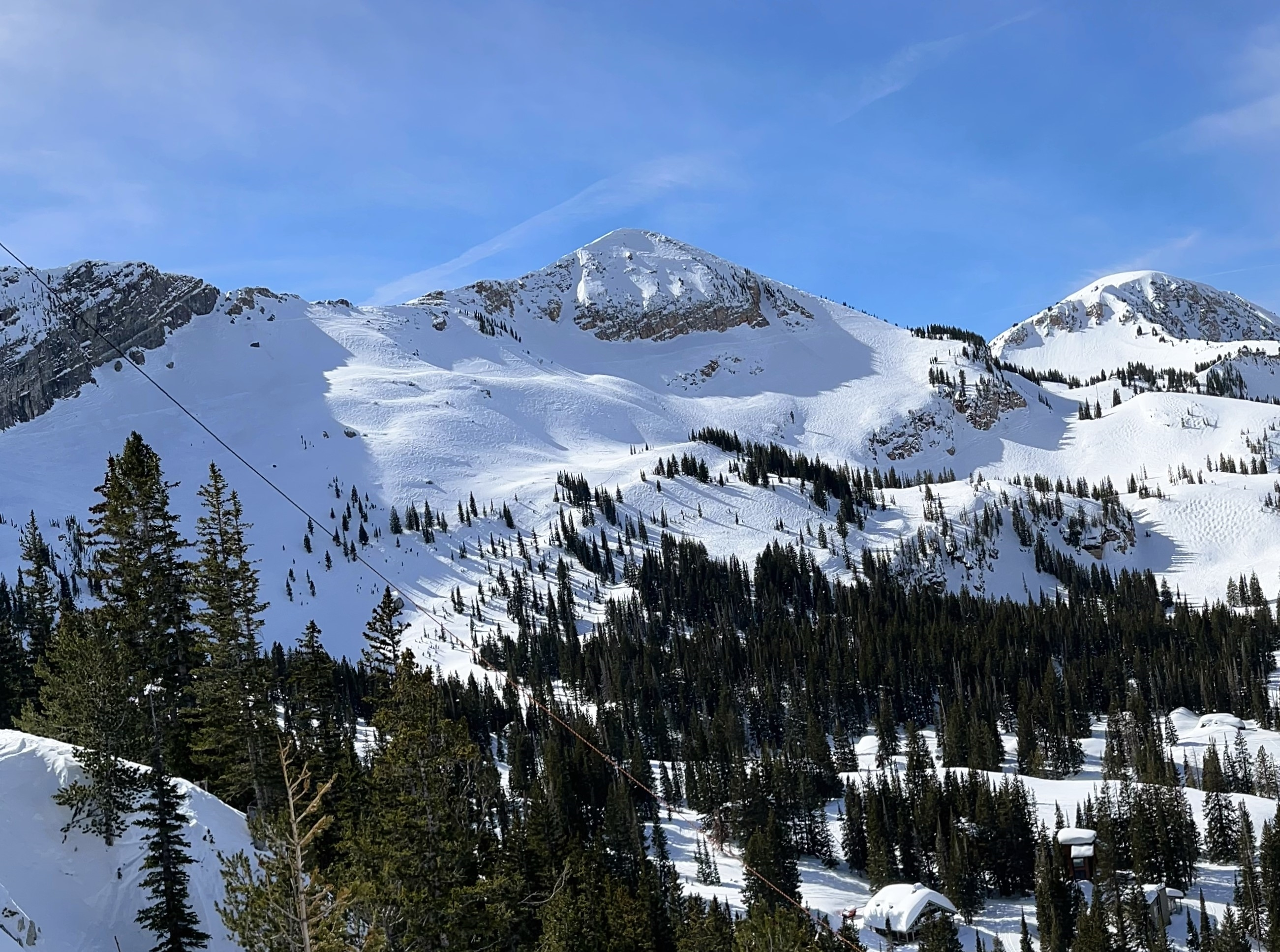
Northeast aspect

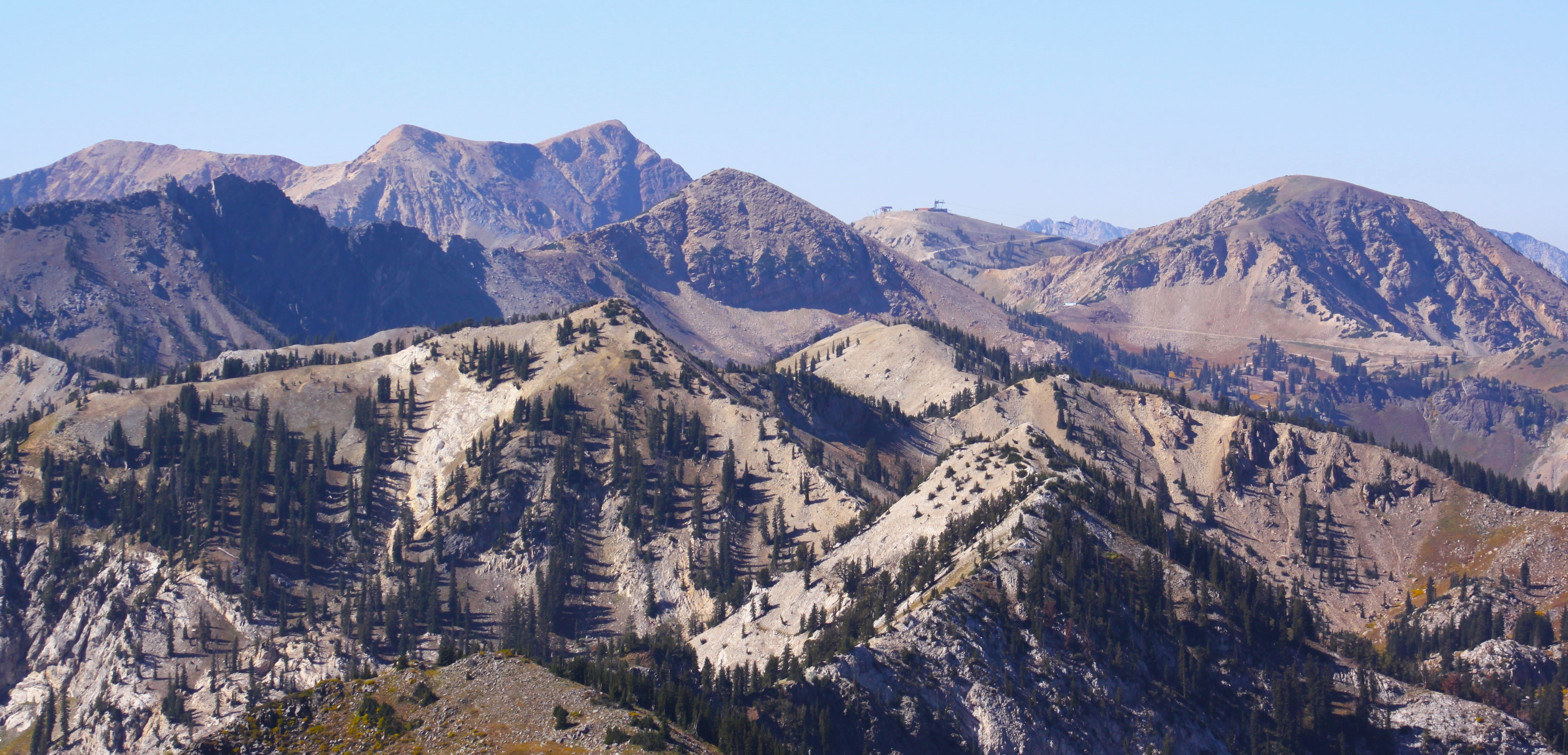
Sugarloaf Mountain (center), Sunset Peak front left, Twin Peaks behind left, Mount Baldy to right. Viewed from Clayton Peak.

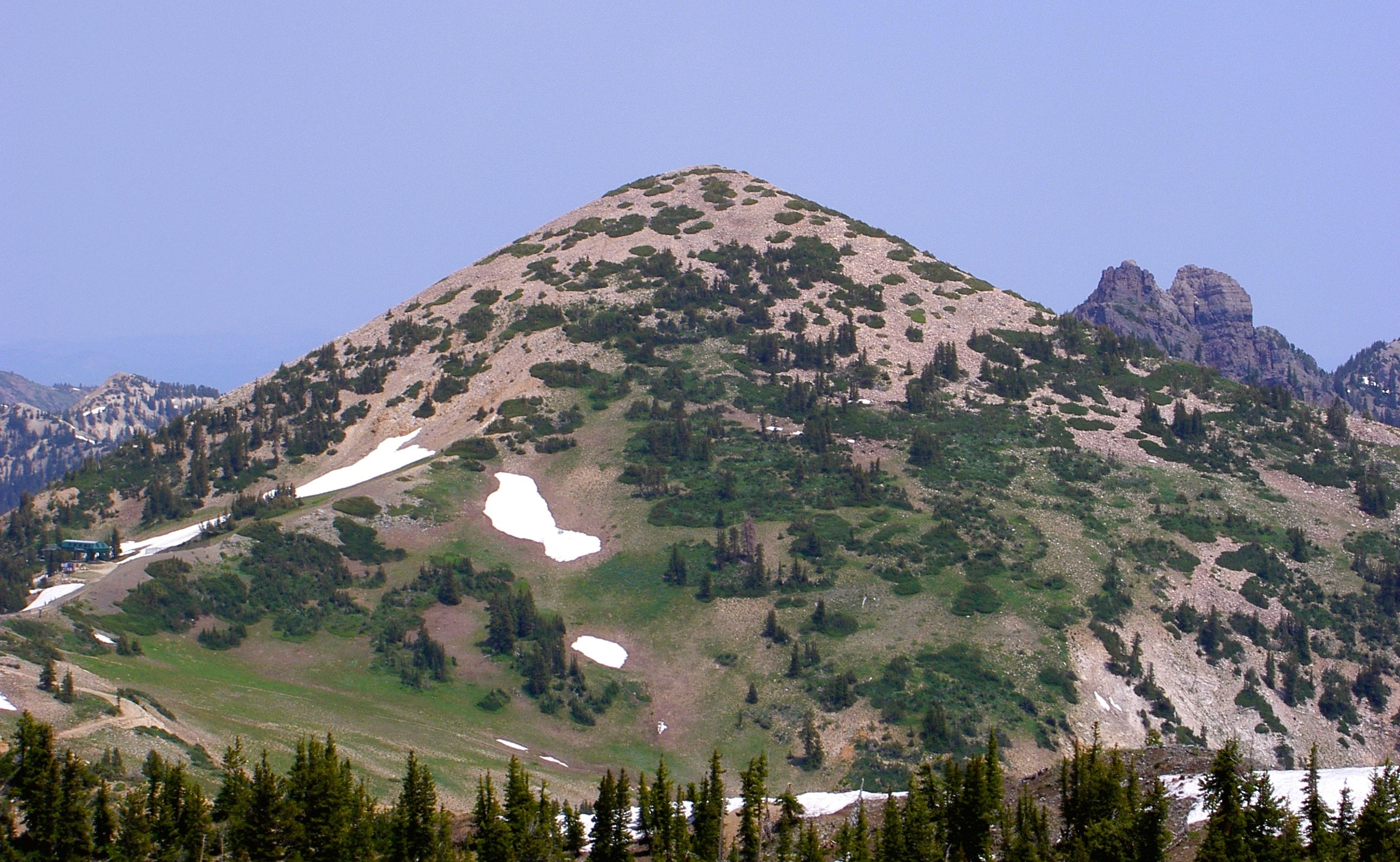
West aspect of Sugarloaf, with Devils Castle (behind, right)

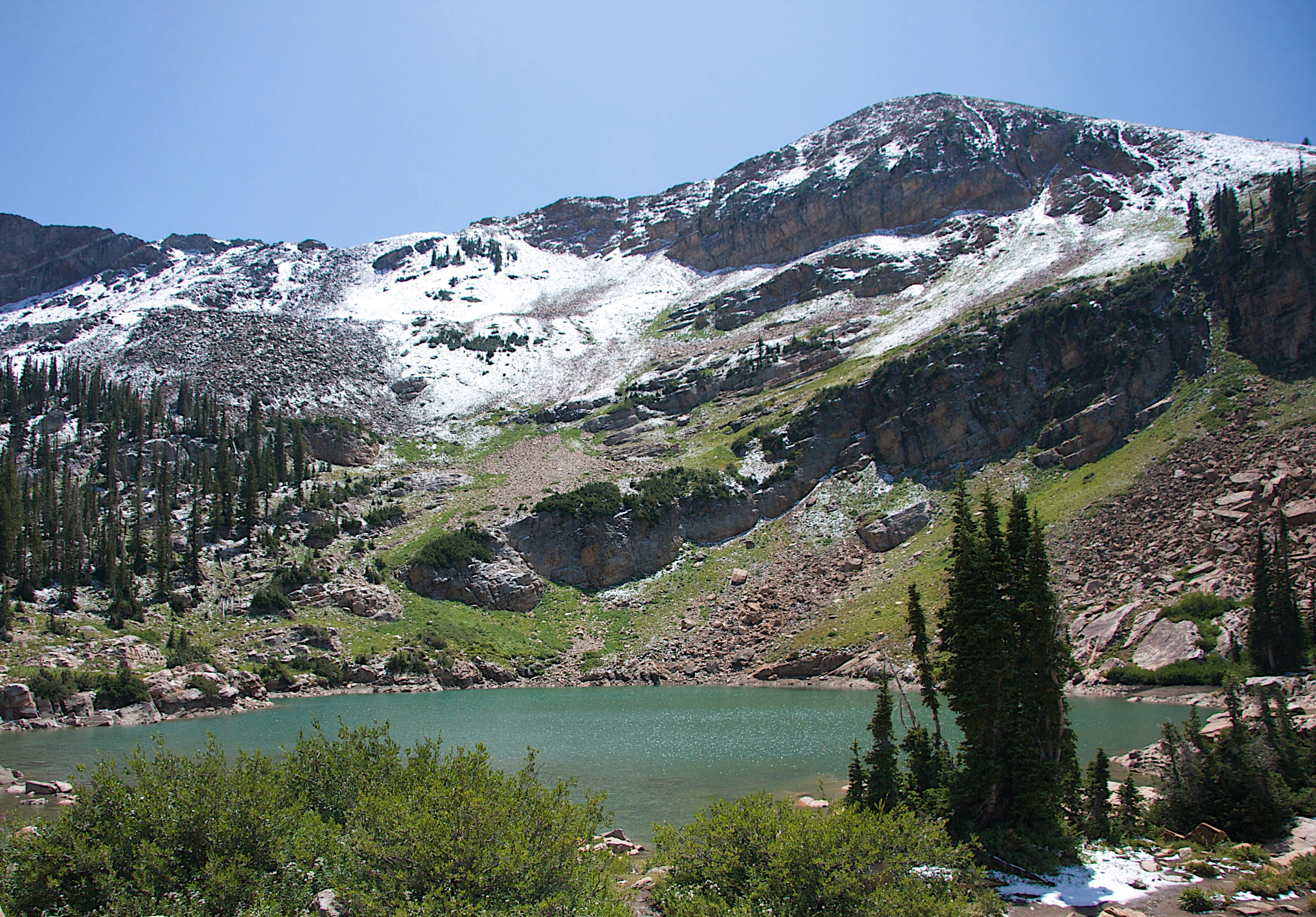
Cecret Lake and Sugarloaf
