= Timpanogos Cave National Monument =

National monument in Utah, United States

- IUCN category III (natural monument or feature)
- Location within Utah Location within the United States
- Interactive map of Timpanogos Cave National Monument
- Location: Utah County, Utah, United States
- Nearest city: Highland, Utah
- Coordinates: 40°26′26″N 111°42′34″W
- Area: 250 acres (100 ha)
- Created: October 14, 1922
- Visitors: 92,031 (in 2025)
- Governing body: U.S. National Park Service
- Website: Timpanogos Cave National Monument

Timpanogos Cave National Monument is a United States National Monument protecting the Timpanogos Cave Historic District and a cave system in the cliffs of American Fork Canyon in the Wasatch Range, near Highland, Utah, in the United States. The site is managed by the National Park Service. The 1.5-mile-long (2.4 km) trail to the cave entrance gains 1,092 feet (333 m) in elevation, but it is paved and fairly wide, making it accessible for most people. The three caves of the system, one of which is specifically called Timpanogos Cave, are only viewable on guided tours when the monument is open, usually from May through September depending on snow conditions and funding. There is the standard tour going through the cave system, and an Introduction to Caving tour that teaches Leave No Trace caving and goes further into Hansen Cave.

== Three caves ==
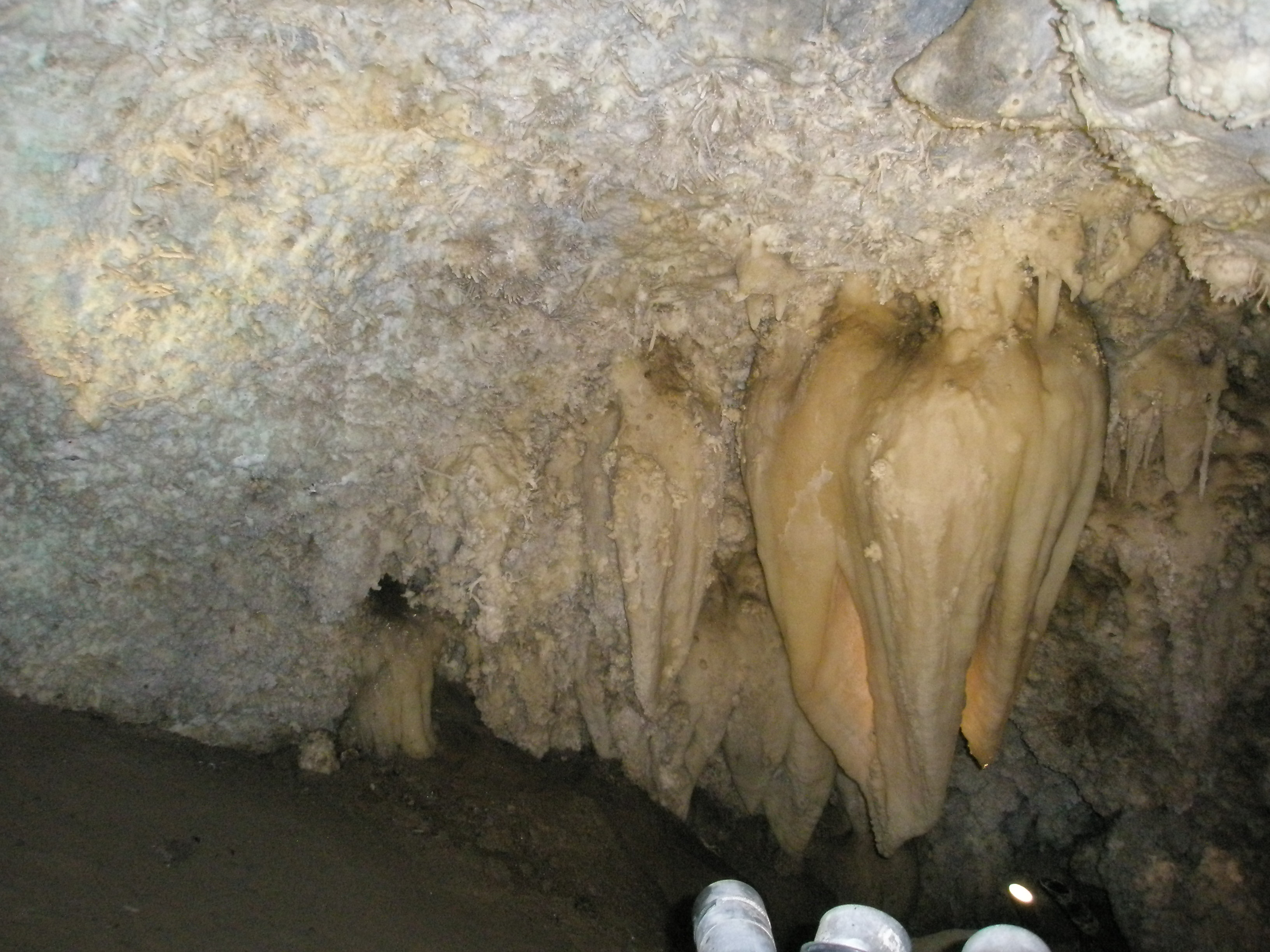
The Great Heart of Timpanogos

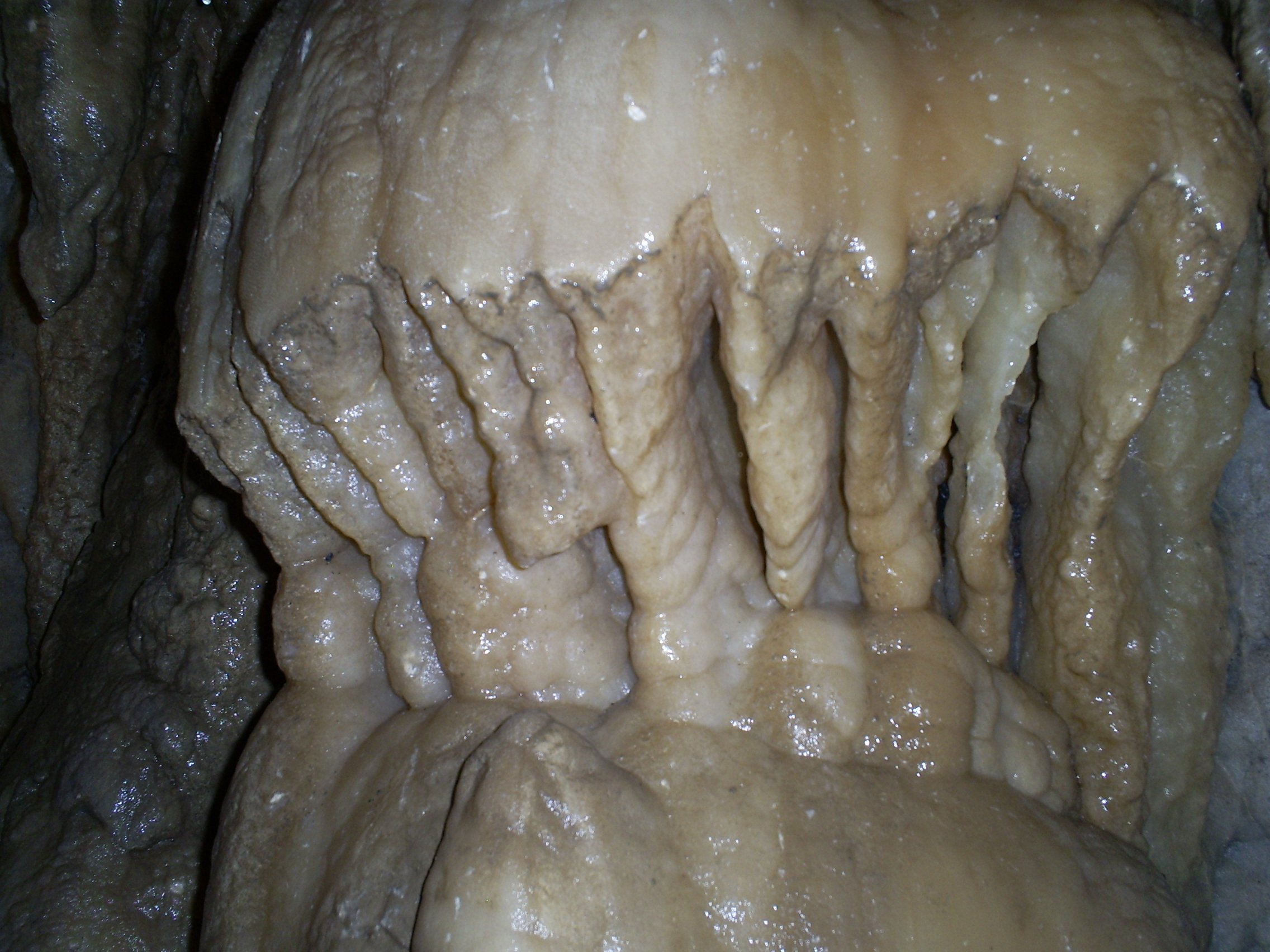
A wall in Timpanogos Cave

The three tourable caves of the Monument are Hansen Cave, Middle Cave, and Timpanogos Cave. The three caves are connected by man-made tunnels blasted in the 1930s by the Works Progress Administration. The average temperature in the caves is 46 degrees Fahrenheit. Many colorful cave features or speleothems can be seen. Among the most interesting are the helictites, which are hollowed, twisted, spiraling straws of deposited calcite or aragonite. They are formed when water travels through the tube and then evaporates, leaving a trace mineral deposit at the end. Other speleothems found in the cave include cave bacon, cave columns, flowstone, cave popcorn, cave drapery, stalactites and stalagmites.

== Discovery of the caves ==
Martin Hansen (1847–1934) discovered what became known as Hansen Cave in October 1887; while cutting timber, he reportedly tracked cougar footprints high up the side of American Fork Canyon. Many of the features and formations in this chamber were damaged or removed by the Duke Onyx Company and the general public before the cave was made a national monument.

In the summer of 1913, a second cave was discovered nearby. While in the area to explore Hansen Cave with their families, teenagers James Williams Gough (1897–1986) and Frank Johnson were climbing an adjacent slope when they discovered the entrance to what is now known as Timpanogos Cave. Several others later entered the cave and viewed many of the formations inside, including the Great Heart of Timpanogos. However, before long, knowledge of the cave and its entrance was lost. Some sources indicate that the entrance was lost due to a landslide in the area, while others say it was, in part, caused by the extreme secrecy of the original finders. Several years later, after hearing rumors of another cave, Vearl James Manwill (1900–1966) came with a group of associates (which later became the Payson Alpine Club) in search of the mysterious hidden cave. On August 14, 1921 he rediscovered it, although many sources credit him as having discovered the cave. He immediately shared the information with the other members of the group. Having in mind the extreme damage that had resulted in Hansen Cave, that very night the group dedicated themselves to the preservation of the cave. Of that night, Manwill wrote in his journal that they discussed ways "to preserve its beauty for posterity instead of allowing it to be vandalized as Hansen's Cave had been". Shortly thereafter they reported their find to the United States Forest Service.

Later that fall, on October 15, 1921, Martin’s son, George Heber Hansen (1884–1951) and Martin’s grandson, Wayne Errol Hansen (1903–1989), were hunting on the other side of the canyon. While using binoculars to try to find deer, they came across another hole in the mountain, between the other two caves. In a few days they came back, with 74-year-old Martin Hansen. Martin was the first to enter the cave, now called Middle Cave.

Current tours of the cave system enter the caves though a man-made entrance very close to the entrance discovered by Martin Hansen. Passing through a tunnel, tours continue on to Middle Cave, before passing through another tunnel to Timpanogos Cave. Finally, tours return to the surface through a man-made exit near the original entrance.

== Administration ==
Although the site was designated a national monument on October 14, 1922, the site was initially developed and maintained by the U.S. Forest Service. The National Park Service took over management in 1933. A number of park structures were built by the Works Progress Administration in the 1930s and early 1940s. The Timpanogos Cave Historic District was designated in 1982 to include these structures.

Middle Cave and Timpanogos Cave were discovered in an era where their formations and resources could be protected. The National Park Service, which oversees and preserves the cave complex, has continued to develop new ways to retain its natural features, including limiting lighting in the caves to retard growth of invasive organisms. Preservation is a high priority. The resource management team at the monument is actively involved in protecting the cave and its surroundings. The National Park Service is continually monitoring and striving to determine a successful balance between visitor access and cave preservation. A limited number of people per tour was implemented to help lessen the human impacts in the caves.

The National Park Service also balances preservation with the needs of the Monument's staff. The Monument's original visitor center burned down in 1991, and the visitor center was housed in a double wide trailer house for almost three decades. With the temporary visitor center in a dangerous rock-fall zone, plans for a new center came under consideration. Following the monument closing for the season in September 2018, construction began on the new trailhead and visitor center. The trail and monument reopened to the public in June 2019.

== Geology ==
The cave system is located in the Deseret Limestone, a Mississippian age limestone formed around 340 million years ago. Notably, the cave cavity was formed initially by a series of faults running off of the Wasatch Fault. Since that time hydrothermal water action perhaps similar to that of Cave of the Winds in Colorado, and uplift of the Wasatch Range has formed the modern cave system. The speleothems first started to form within the last 750,000 years, based on paleomagnetism of iron deposits within the formations, as the cave system has been slowly lifted above the unnamed stream that flows though the canyon (and becomes the American Fork river at the mouth of the canyon).

== See also ==
- List of national monuments of the United States
- Protected areas of the United States
- Mount Timpanogos
