= Sunset Peak =

Sunset Peak may refer to:

- Sunset Peak (Alaska) in Alaska, United States
- Sunset Peak (Hong Kong)
- Sunset Peak (Jammu and Kashmir) in Jammu and Kashmir
- Sunset Peak (Park County, Montana) in Montana, United States
- Sunset Peak (New Brunswick) in New Brunswick, Canada
- Sunset Peak (Snowcrest Range) in Montana, United States
- Sunset Peak (Utah), in the Wasatch Range, United States
