= Clayton Peak =

Mountain in Utah, United States

- Mount Majestic
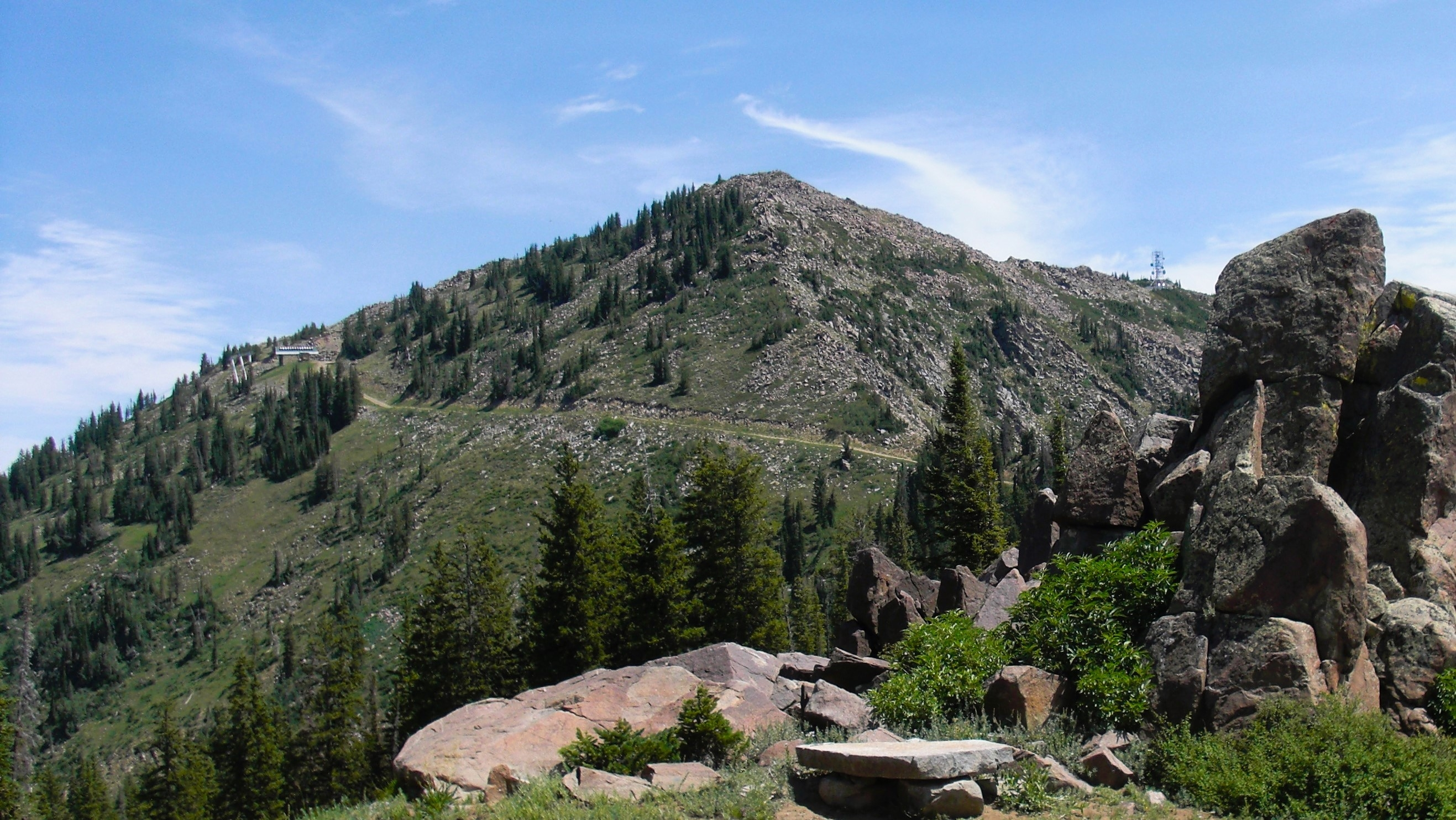
- West aspect

Highest point
- Elevation: 10,721 ft (3,268 m)
- Prominence: 701 ft (214 m)
- Parent peak: Sugarloaf Mountain
- Isolation: 2.31 mi (3.72 km)
- Coordinates: 40°35′27″N 111°33′36″W

Naming
- Etymology: William H. Clayton

Geography
- Location within Utah Location within the United States
- Country: United States
- State: Utah
- County: Salt Lake / Wasatch
- Protected area: Wasatch Mountain State Park
- Parent range: Wasatch Range; Rocky Mountains
- Topo map: USGS Brighton

Geology
- Rock type(s): Diorite, Granodiorite

Climbing
- Easiest route: class 2 hiking

Clayton Peak, also known unofficially as Mount Majestic, is a 10,721-foot-elevation (3,268-meter) summit on the boundary that Salt Lake County shares with Wasatch County, in Utah, United States.

== Description ==
Clayton Peak is located 22 miles (35 km) southeast of downtown Salt Lake City and 1.5 miles (2.4 km) southeast of Brighton in the Wasatch–Cache National Forest. The peak is set in the Wasatch Range which is a subrange of the Rocky Mountains. Precipitation runoff from the mountain's west slope drains into headwaters of Big Cottonwood Creek, whereas the east slope drains to Snake Creek. Topographic relief is significant as the summit rises 2,900 feet (884 meters) above Snake Creek in 1.5 mile (2.4 km). From Guardsman Pass, reaching the top involves 2.2 miles (round-trip) of hiking along a portion of the Great Western Trail with 1,015 feet of elevation gain. The summit provides views of the Brighton Lakes area, the Uinta Mountains, Heber Valley, and Mount Timpanogos. This mountain's toponym has been officially adopted by the United States Board on Geographic Names, and has been recorded in publications since at least 1891.

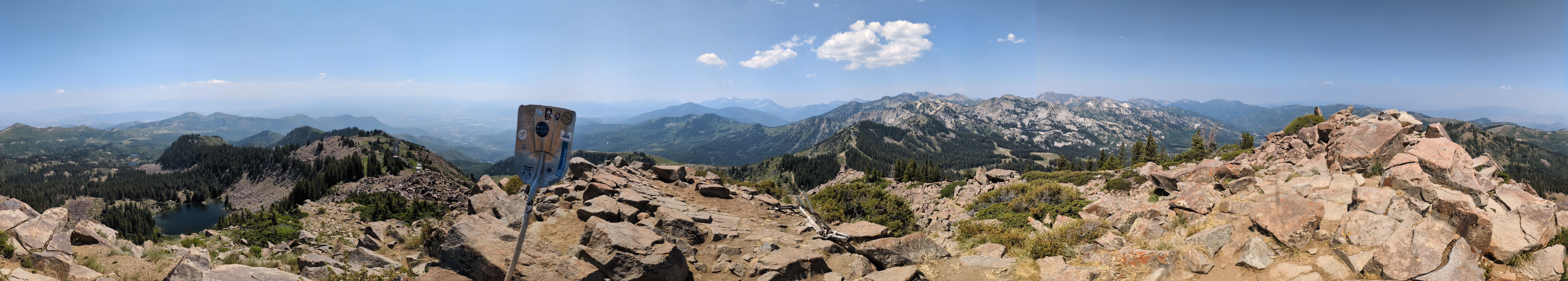
Panorama from the summit, 24 July 2024

== Climate ==
Clayton Peak has a subarctic climate (Köppen Dfc), bordering on an Alpine climate (Köppen ET), with long, cold, snowy winters, and cool to warm summers. Due to its altitude, it receives precipitation all year, as snow in winter, and as thunderstorms in summer. This climate supports skiing at the Brighton Ski Resort on the peak's west slope.

== Gallery ==
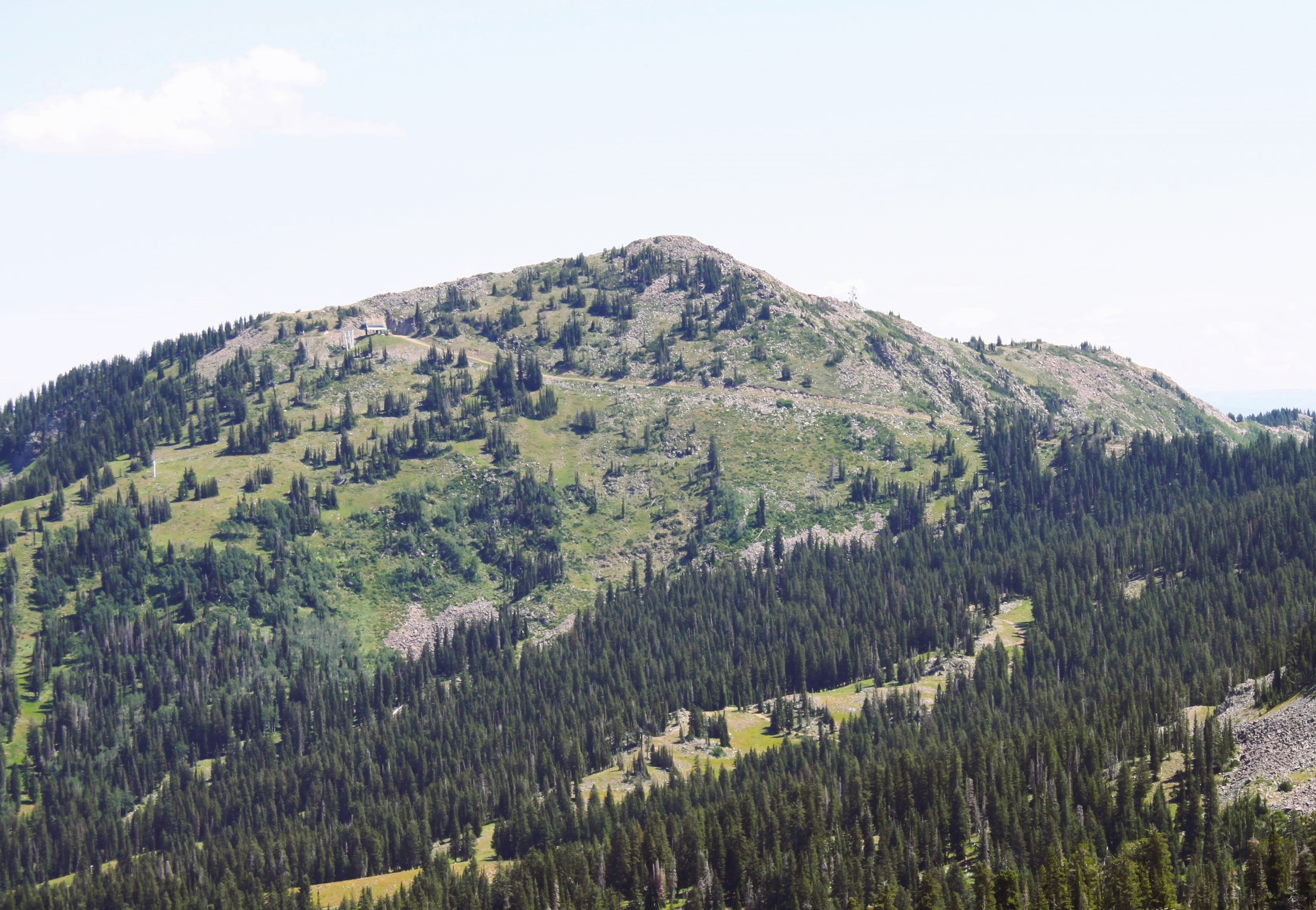
West aspect

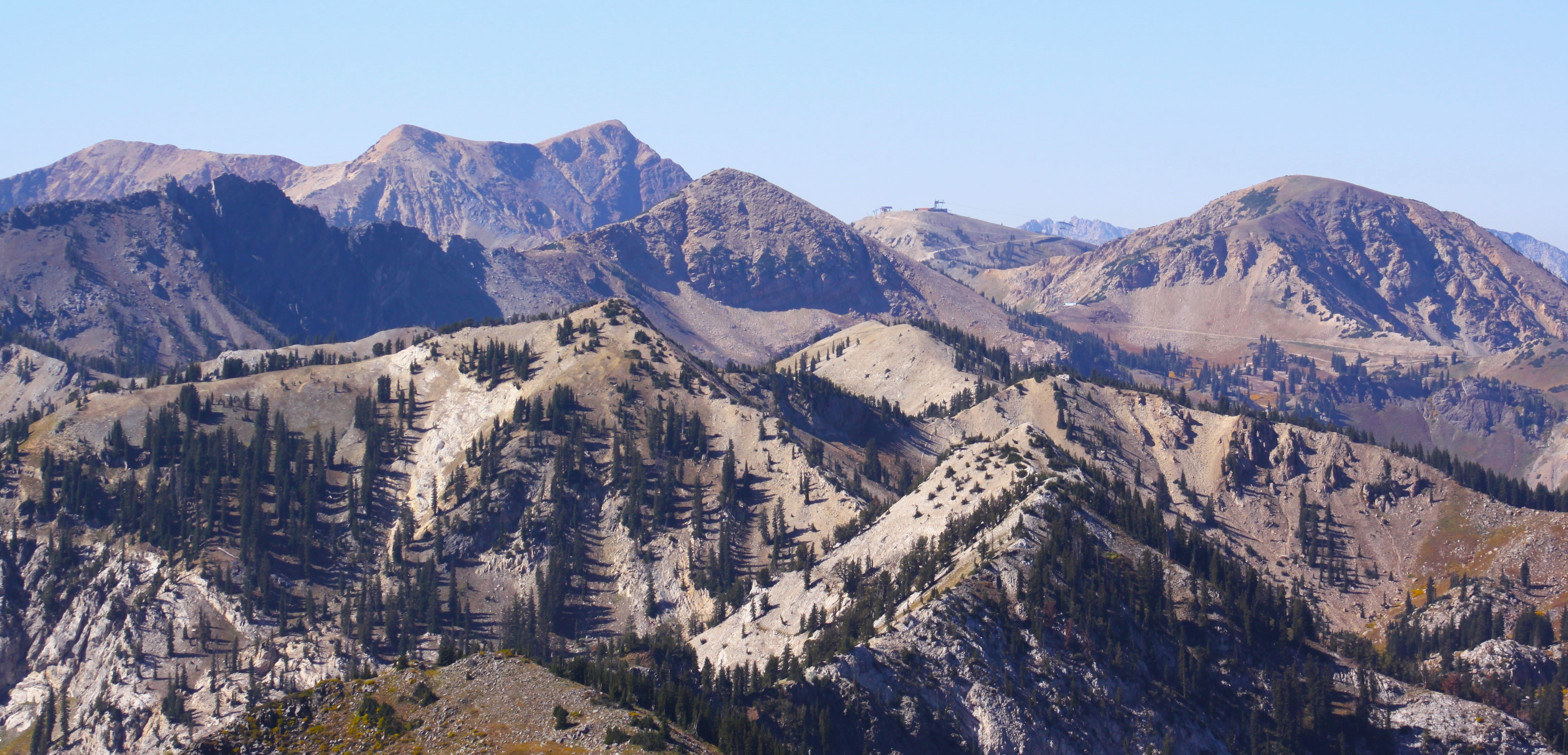
View from Clayton Peak looking toward Sugarloaf Mountain (center), Twin Peaks behind left, Mount Baldy to right.
