= Mount Baldy (Salt Lake County, Utah) =

Mountain in Utah, United States

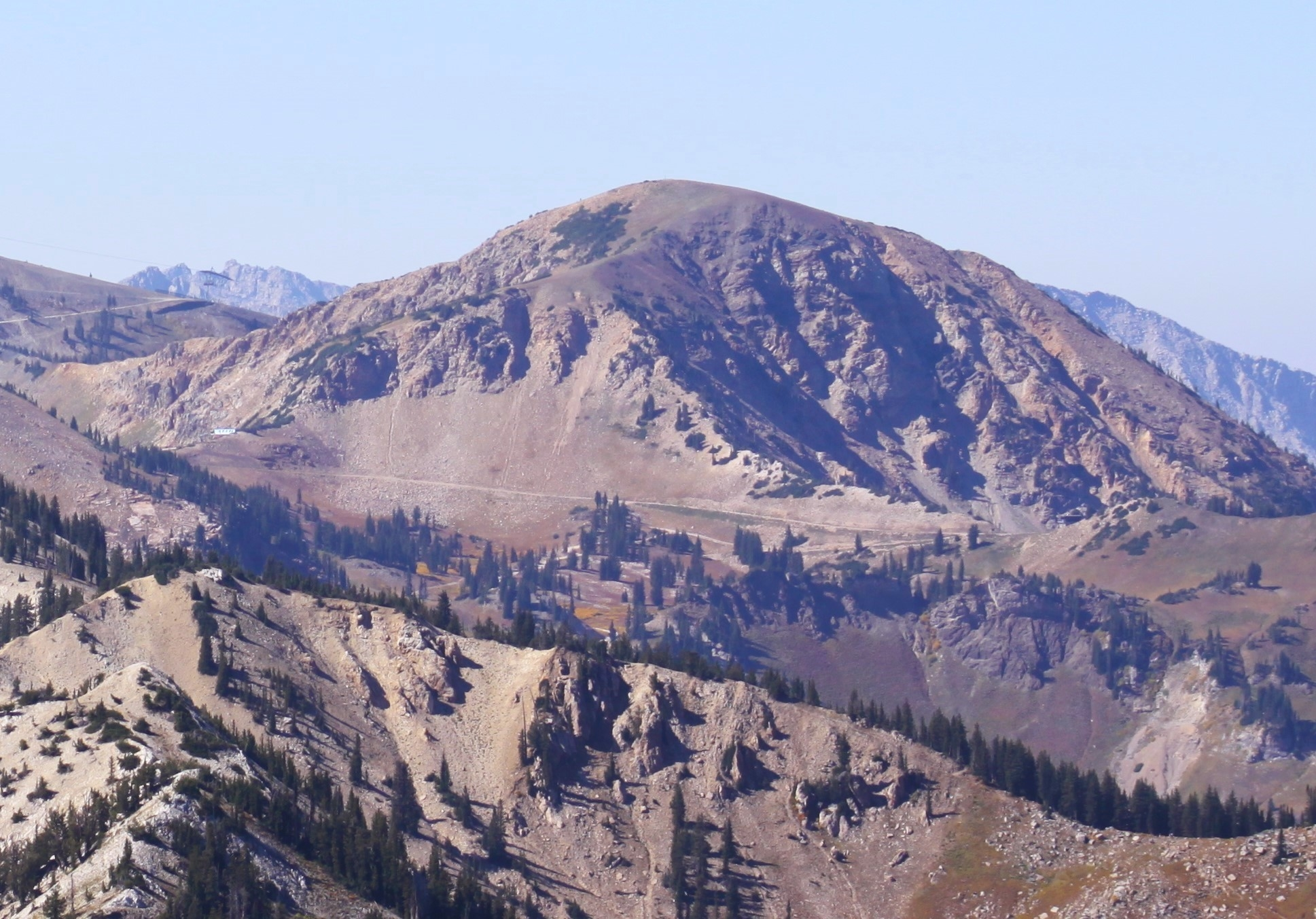
- East-northeast aspect

Highest point
- Elevation: 11,068 ft (3,374 m)
- Prominence: 368 ft (112 m)
- Parent peak: Twin Peaks
- Isolation: 1.4 mi (2.3 km)
- Coordinates: 40°34′05″N 111°38′17″W

Geography
- Location within Utah Location within the United States
- Country: United States
- State: Utah
- County: Salt Lake / Utah
- Parent range: Wasatch Range; Rocky Mountains
- Topo map: USGS Dromedary Peak

Climbing
- Easiest route: class 1 hiking

Mount Baldy is an 11,068-foot-elevation (3,374-meter) summit on the boundary that Salt Lake County shares with Utah County, in Utah, United States.

== Description ==
Mount Baldy is located 19 miles (31 km) southeast of downtown Salt Lake City at the Alta Ski Area in the Wasatch–Cache National Forest. The peak is part of the Wasatch Range which is a subrange of the Rocky Mountains. Precipitation runoff from the mountain's north slope drains to Little Cottonwood Creek, whereas the south slope drains into headwaters of the American Fork River. Topographic relief is significant as the summit rises approximately 3,000 feet (914 meters) above Little Cottonwood Canyon in 1.5 mile (2.4 km). This mountain's toponym has been officially adopted by the United States Board on Geographic Names.

== Climate ==
Mount Baldy has a subarctic climate (Köppen Dfc), bordering on an Alpine climate (Köppen ET), with long, cold, snowy winters, and cool to warm summers. Due to its altitude, it receives precipitation all year, as snow in winter, and as thunderstorms in summer.

== Gallery ==
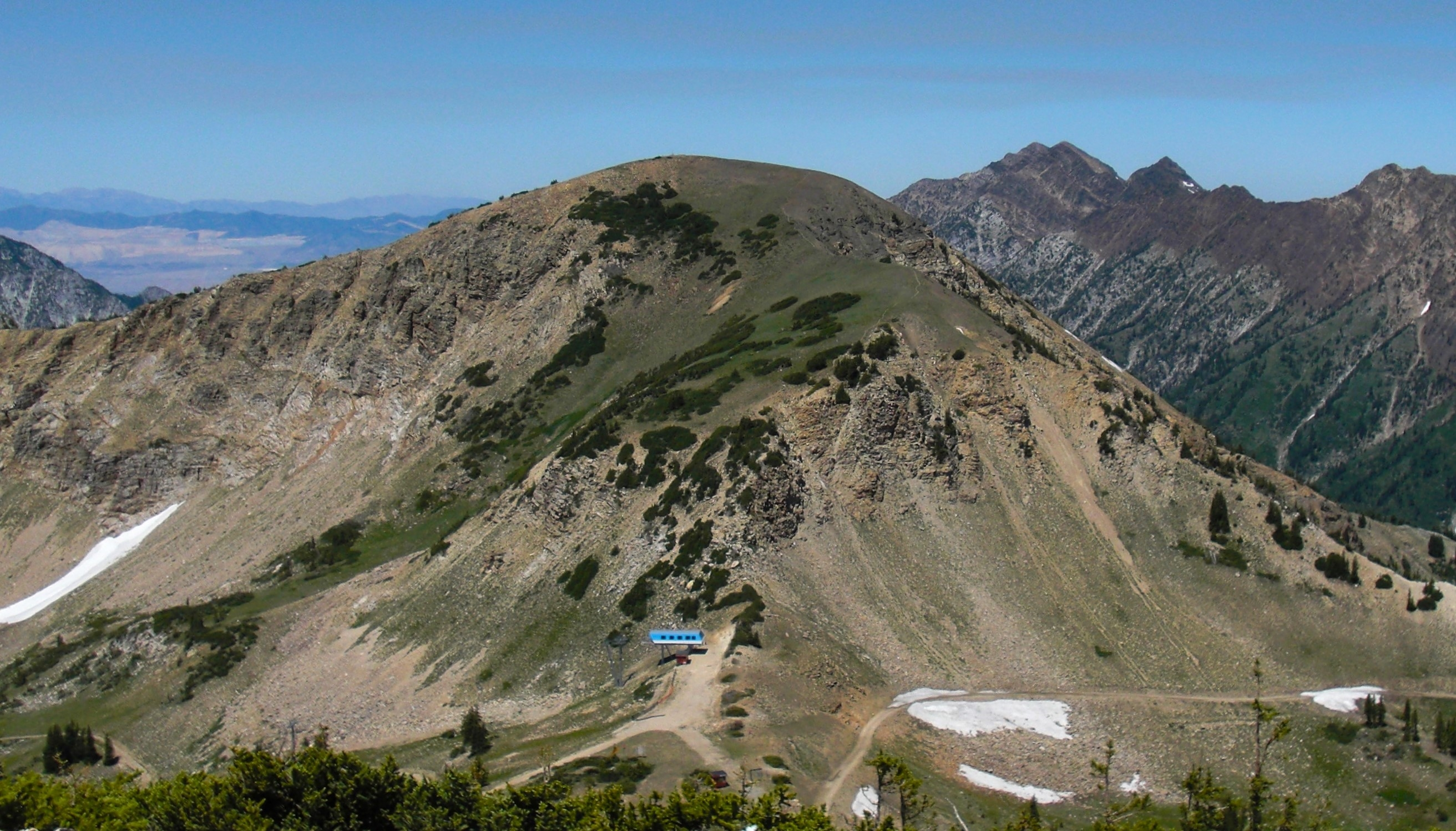
East aspect of Mount Baldy viewed from Sugarloaf Mountain

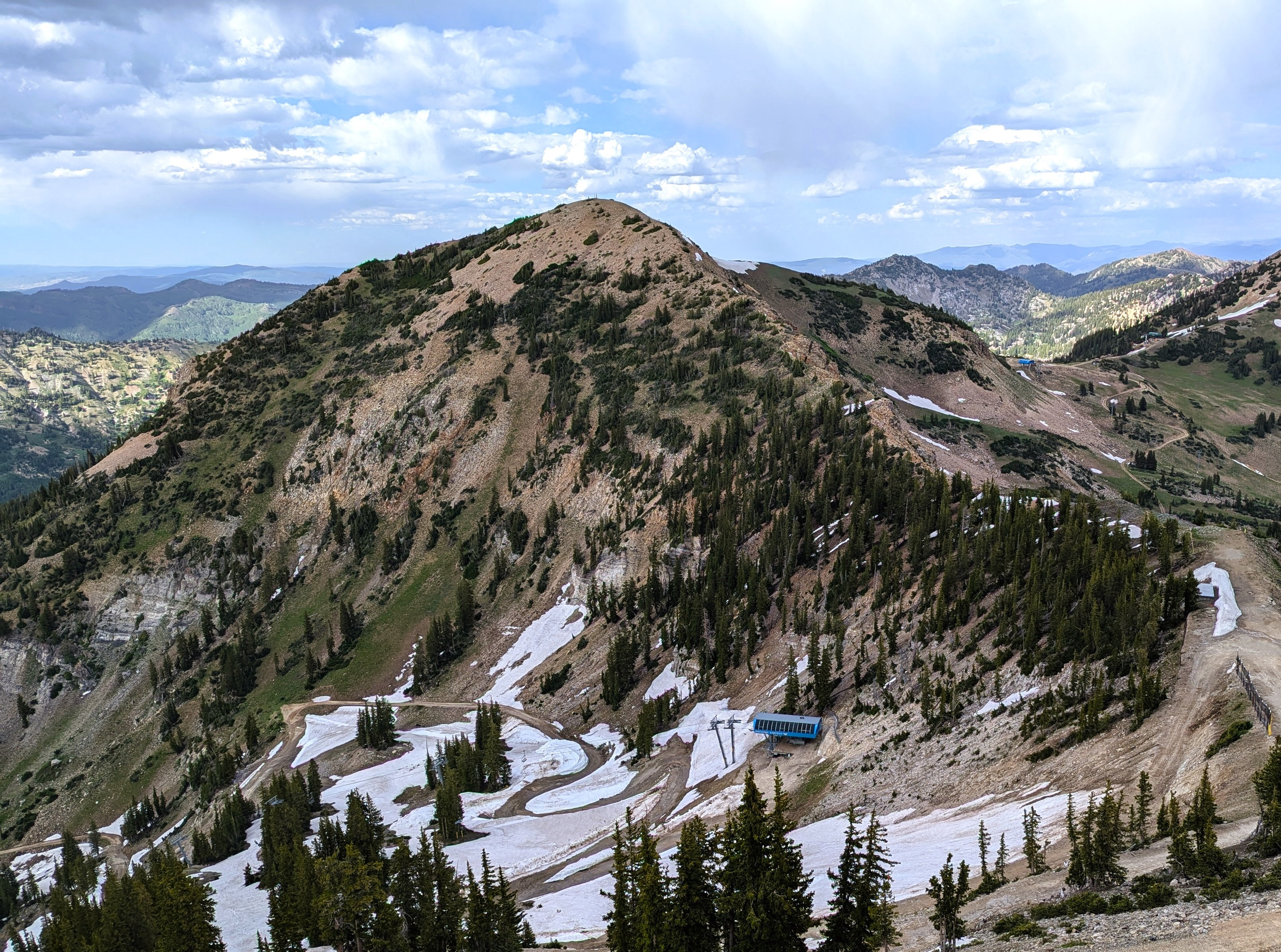
Southwest aspect of Mount Baldy viewed from Hidden Peak

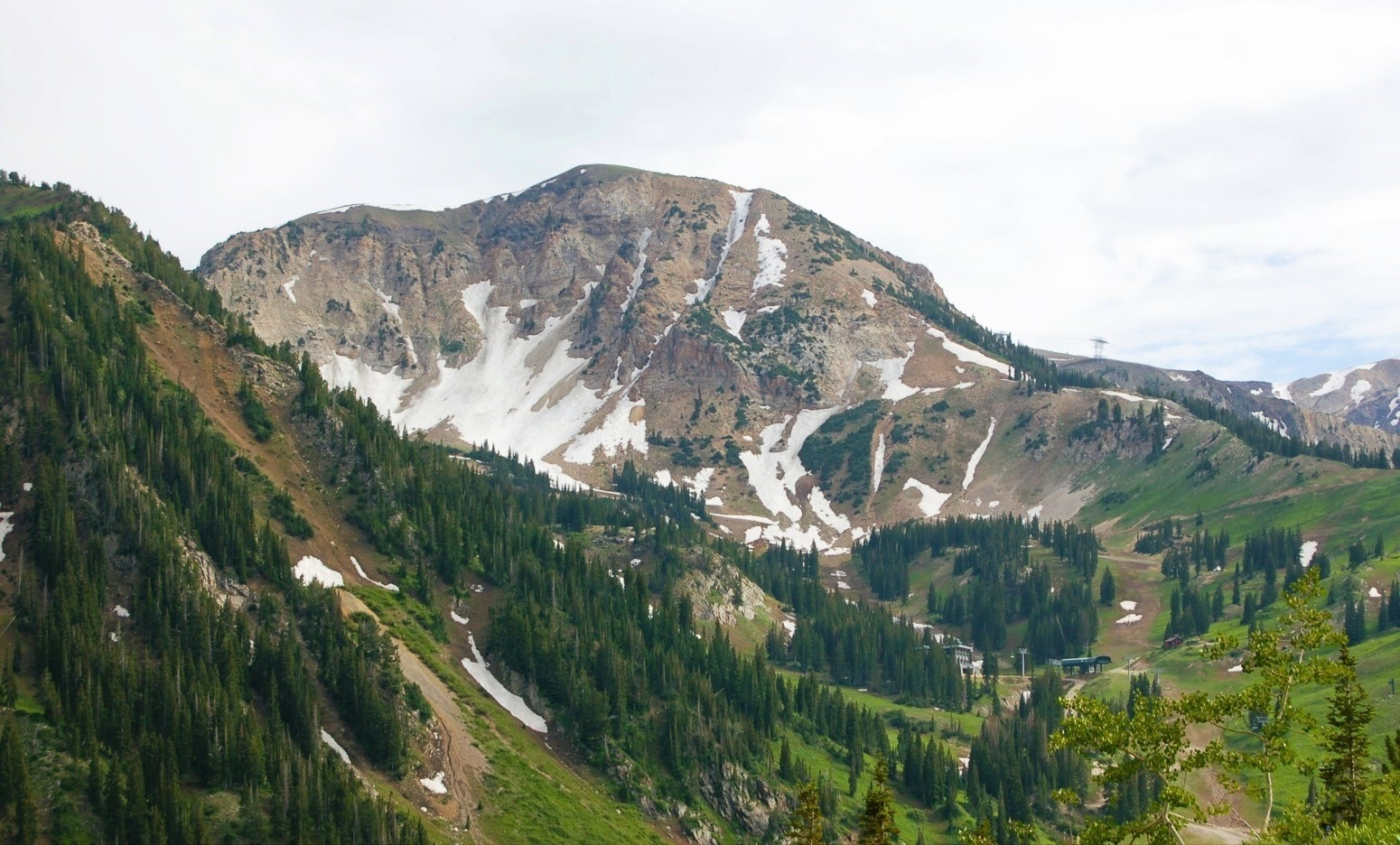
North aspect

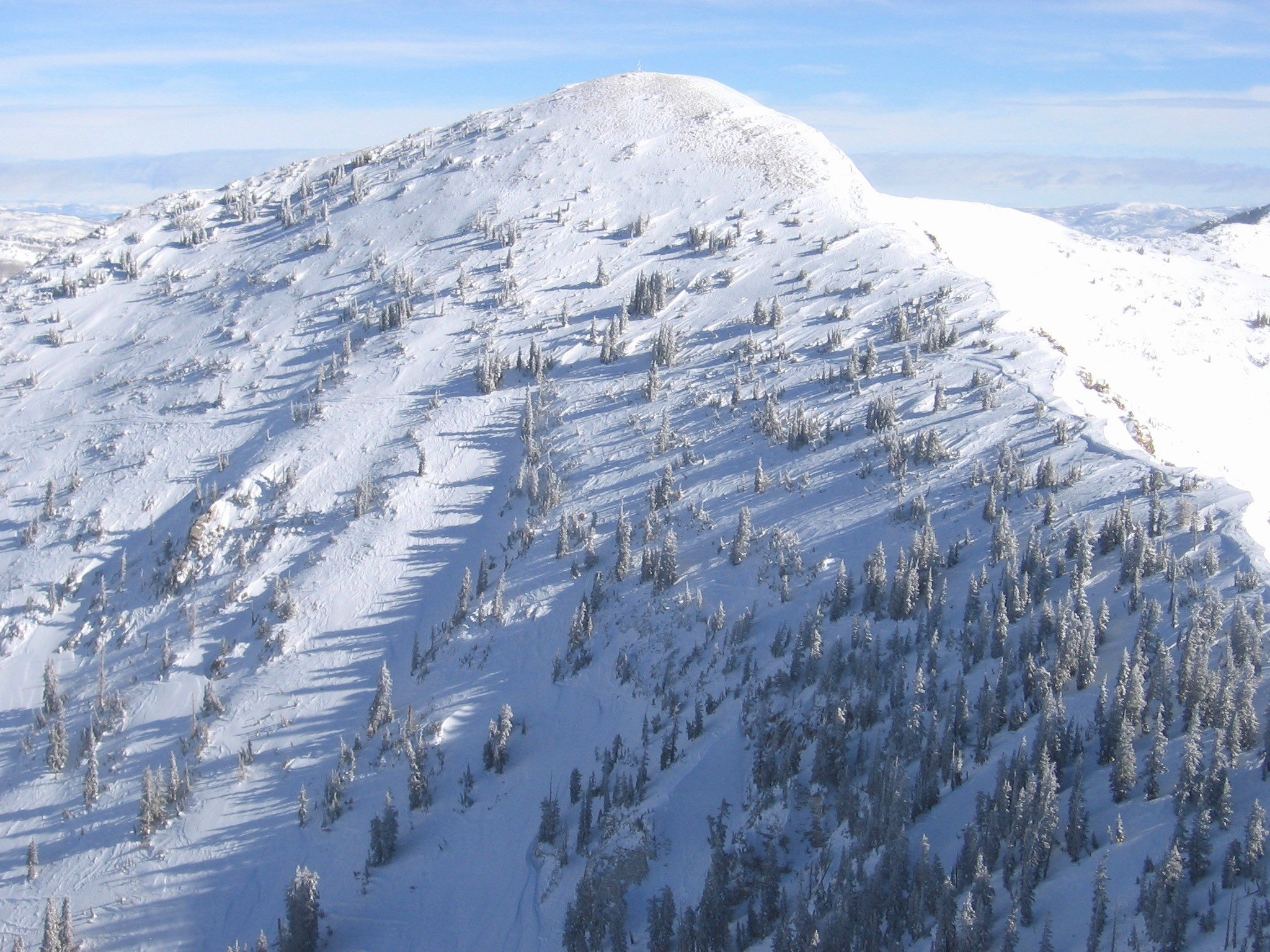
Southwest aspect

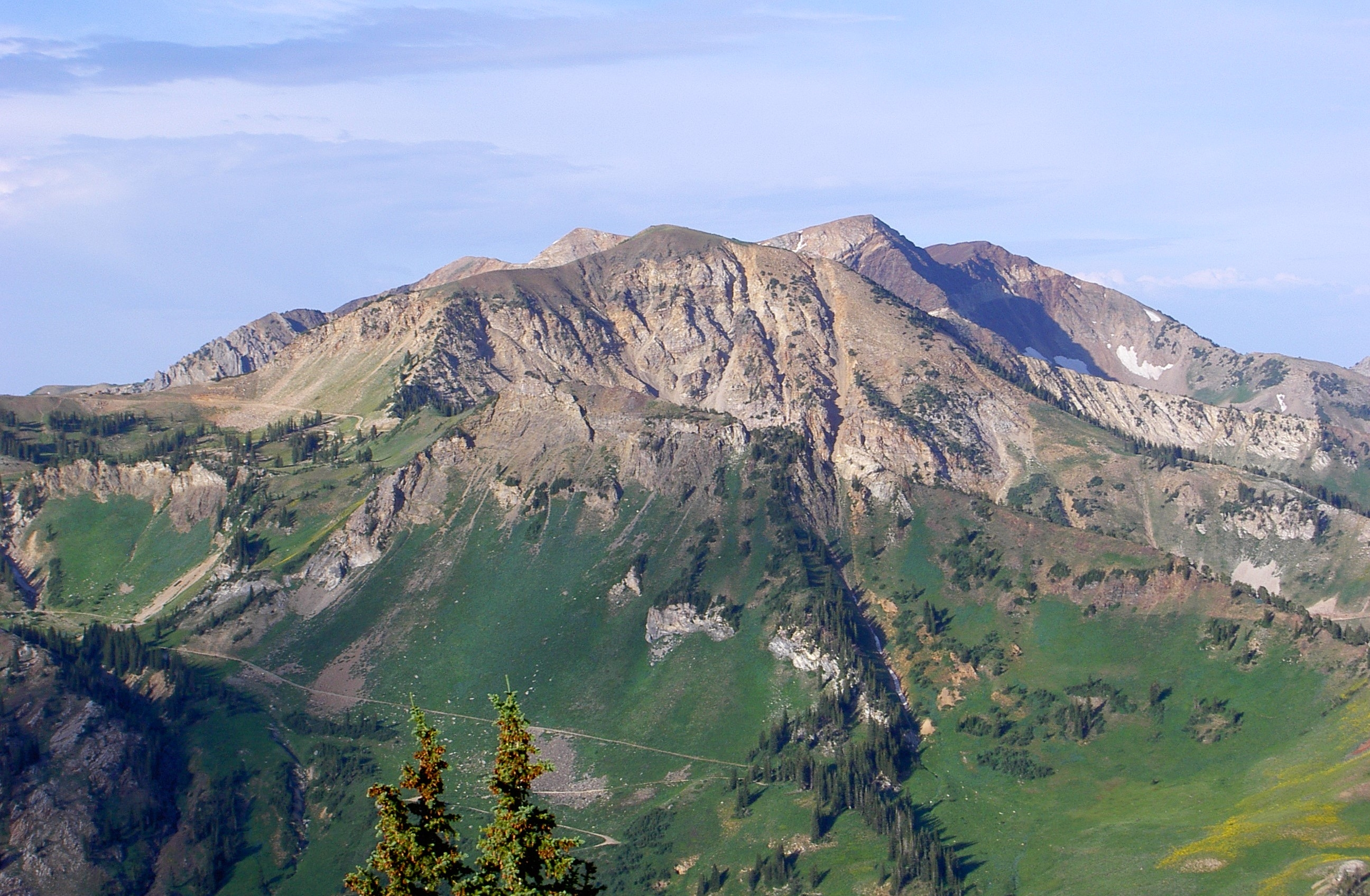
Northeast aspect of Mount Baldy, with Twin Peaks behind

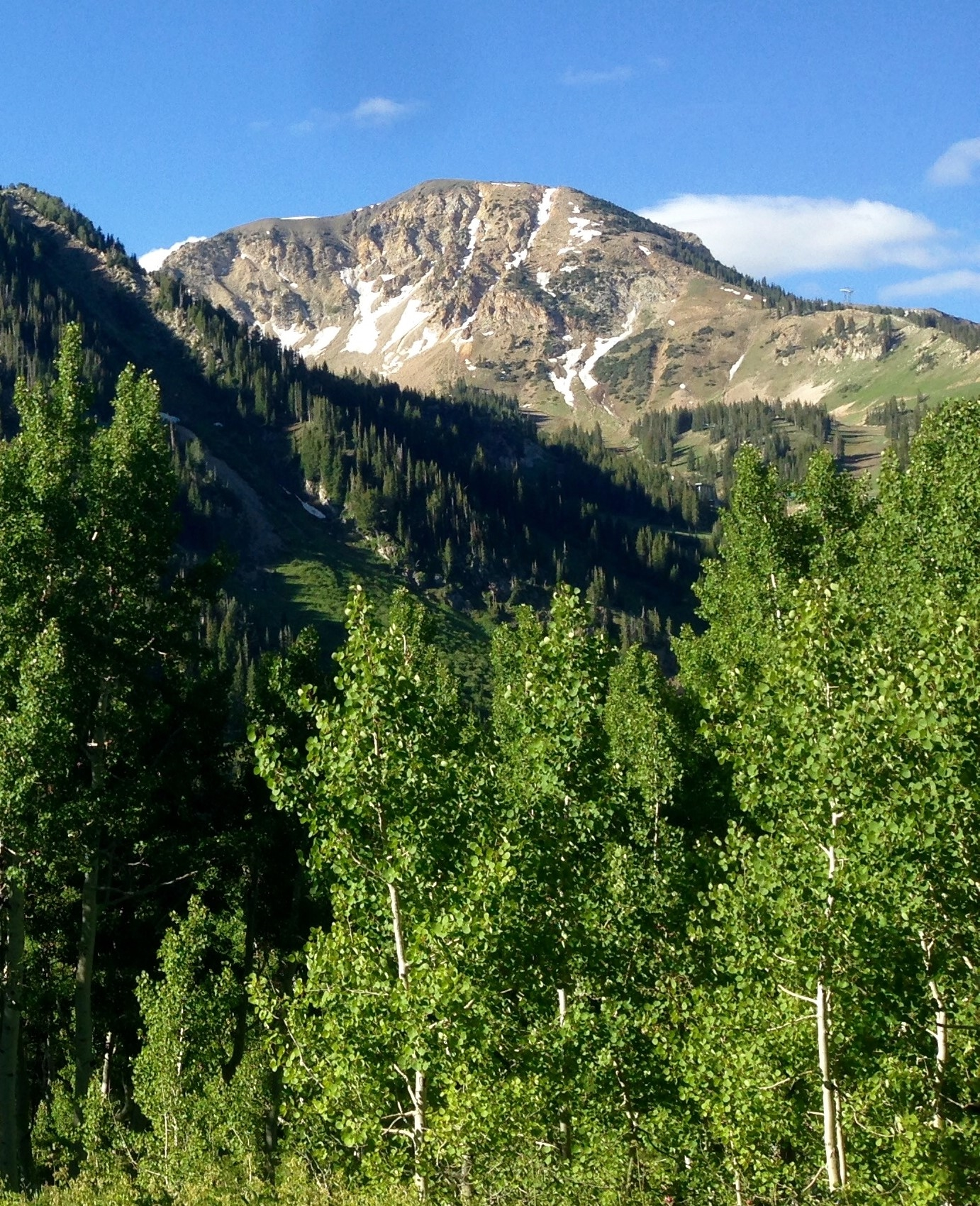
Mount Baldy

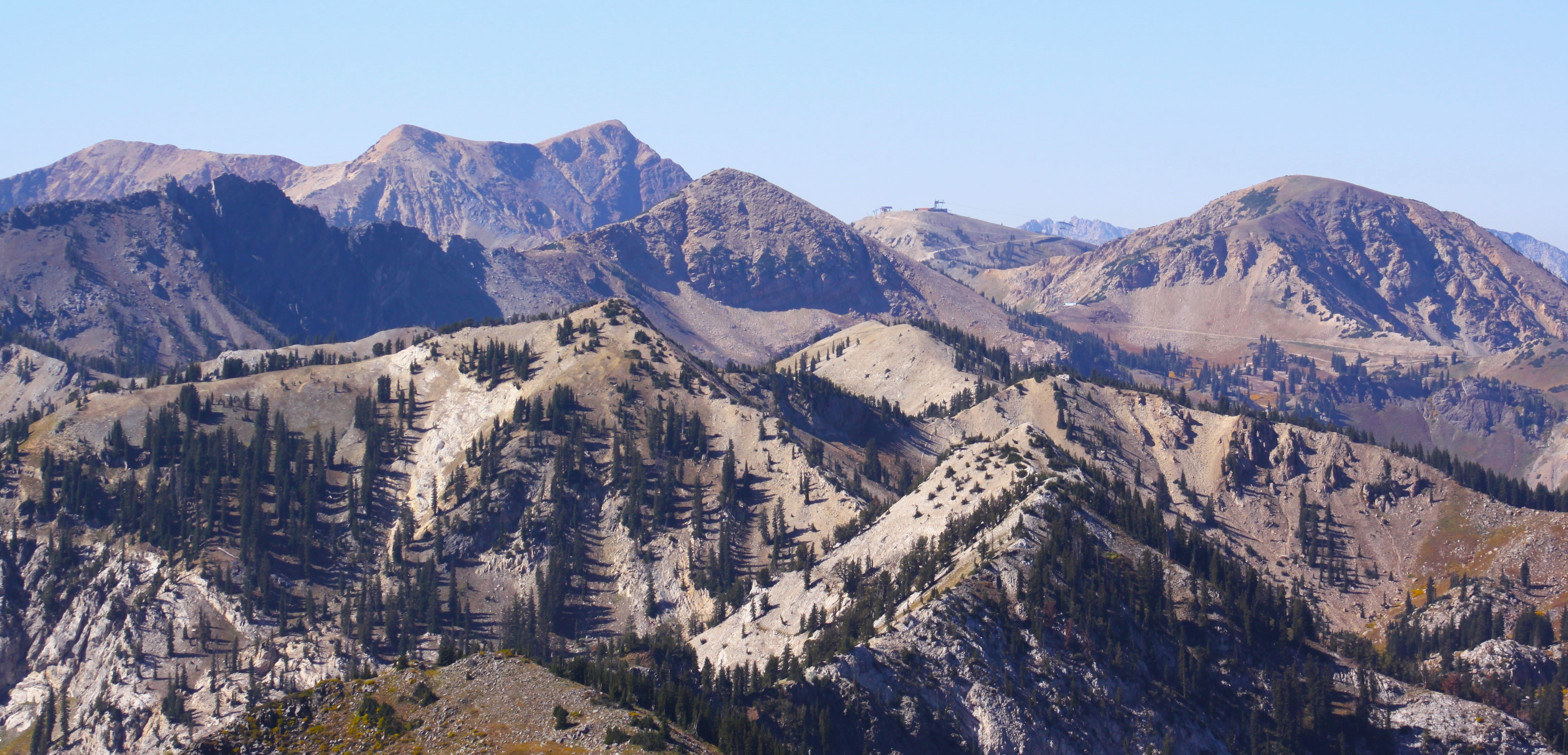
Sugarloaf Mountain (center), Twin Peaks behind left, Mount Baldy to right, viewed from Clayton Peak.
