= Lone Peak Fire District =

Agency overview
- Staffing: 17 Fulltime
- Fire chief: Reed Thompson

Facilities and equipment
- Stations: 2
- Engines: 1
- Trucks: 2
- Rescues: 1
- Ambulances: 3
- Tenders: 1
- Wildland: 3

Website
- https://www.lonepeakfire.com/

The Lone Peak Fire District provides fire protection, emergency medical services, and technical rescue to Alpine, Highland and areas of American Fork Canyon in northern Utah County. The Lone Peak Fire District is part of the Lone Peak Public Safety District.

== History ==
The Alpine fire department was formed in 1943 as a volunteer fire department. In January 1995 the communities of Alpine and Highland joined and formed the Alpine/Highland Fire District. In July 1996 the Alpine/Highland Public Safety District was formed, combining fire, ambulance, and police services under a district board and, effective July 1, 1998, the Fire and EMS departments were combined under the fire chief. Craig Carlisle was appointed the first full-time fire chief in June 1998. With the addition of Cedar Hills as a member of the Public Safety District, the District name changed to Lone Peak Public Safety District. The Lone Peak Fire District began full-time paramedic service in September, 2000. As of July 1, 2019, the Fire District provides fire suppression, technical rescue, emergency medical quick-response, paramedic ground ambulance, interfacility ground ambulance, and a variety of other emergency and non-emergency services to the residents and visitors of Alpine City, Highland City, Timpanogos National Monument and American Fork Canyon.

== Stations and staffing ==
LPFD operates from two fire stations with one station in Highland City and one in Alpine City.

As of 2018, LPFD has 17 full-time employees:

- Fire Chief Reed Thompson
- Deputy Fire Chief Chris Evans
- Administrative Assistant (1)
- Captain (6)
- Firefighter/Paramedic/AEMT (9)

The full-time staff is supplemented by a large part-time roster.

== Recent controversy ==
Former fire chief Craig Carlisle resigned abruptly in 2010, citing "personal reasons."
