= Snake Creek (Provo River tributary) =

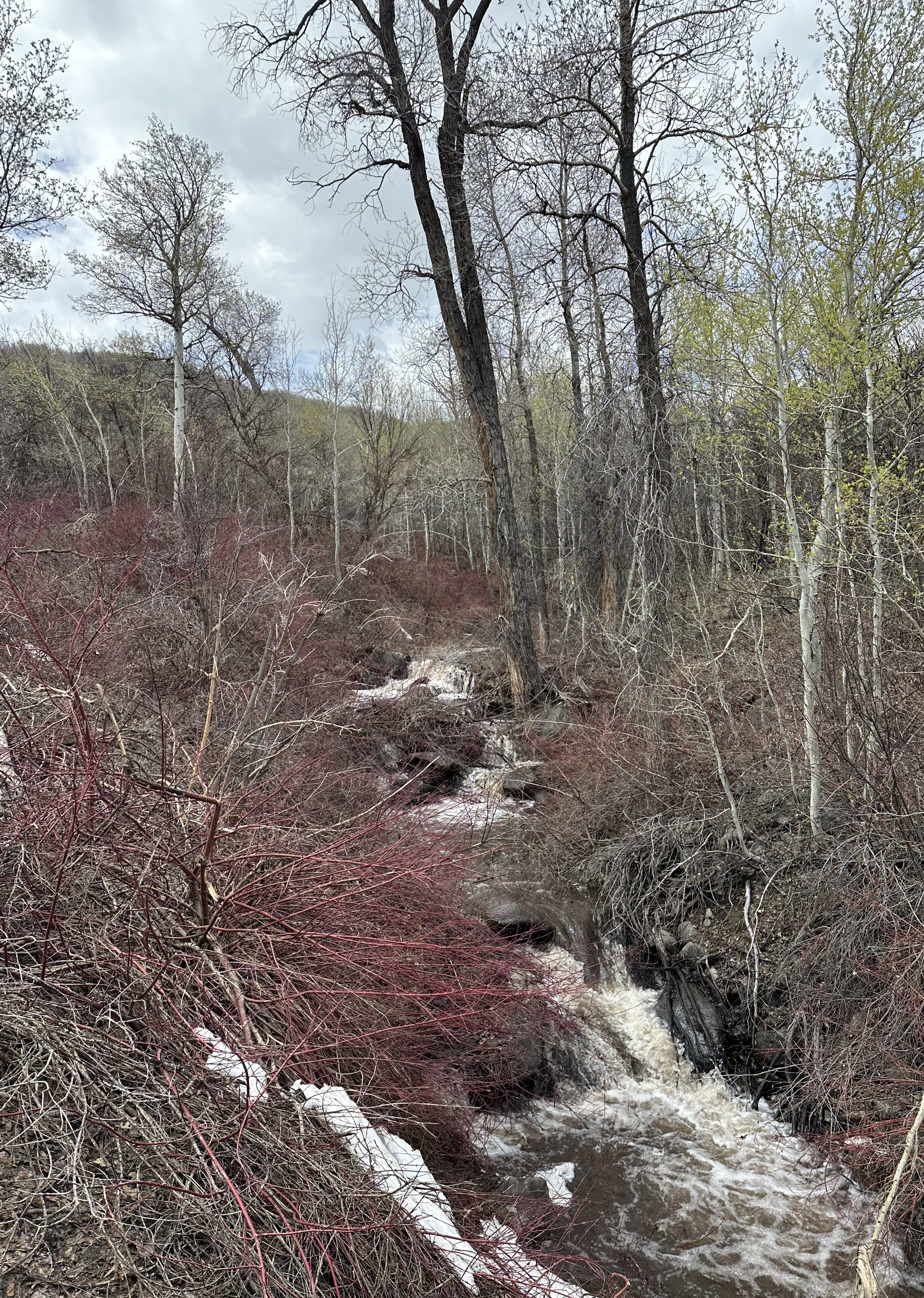
- Pine Creek tributary of Snake Creek, taken from WOW trail in May 2023

- Location of the mouth of the Snake Creek in Utah

Location
- Country: United States
- State: Utah
- County: Wasatch

Physical characteristics
- Source: Wasatch Mountains
  - location: Southeast slope of Sunset Peak, Wasatch Mountains, Wasatch County, Utah
  - coordinates: 40°34′31″N 111°35′06″W
  - elevation: 8,579 ft (2,615 m)
- Mouth: Confluence with middle section of the Provo River, above Deer Creek Reservoir
  - location: Provo, Utah County, Utah
  - coordinates: 40°29′01″N 111°28′00″W
  - elevation: 5,430 ft (1,660 m)

Basin features
- Tributaries
  - left: Lavina Creek, Pine Creek

Snake Creek is a 11.7-mile-long (18.8 km) southeastward-flowing stream tributary to the middle section of the Provo River in Wasatch County, Utah.

== History ==
Snake Creek was named for a nest of rattlesnakes in a dry "hot pots". Hot pots are formed by natural hot-water springs that create crater-like depressions in mounds of tufa (calcium carbonate). The snakes were seen as pests and eradicated, and the dry pot became a limestone quarry.

Snake Creek Canyon saw significant mining activity beginning in 1894 when a reporter wrote of a "handsome specimen of copper" from the head of Snake Creek Canyon. In 1897, the Steamboat Company began work in the Snake Creek headwaters.

== Watershed and course ==
Snake Creek originates on the southeastern slope of Sunset Peak, about 3 miles (4.8 km) south of Brighton. and flows southeast through Snake Creek Canyon, receiving Lavina Creek (from the left heading downstream) and other minor tributaries until it receives Pine Creek at the base on the canyon in Wasatch Mountain State Park. Pine Creek, in turns descends along North Pine Canyon Road and is paralleled by the WOW (Wasatch over Wasatch) Trail. From here Snake Creek flows southward through the city of Midway on the western edge of the Heber Valley. After passing south of Midway, Snake Creek reaches its confluence with the middle section of the Provo River, just above Deer Creek Reservoir.

== Ecology and conservation ==
Since 1995 most of Snake Creek Canyon has been protected, beginning with 758 acres purchased by Utah Open Lands, the Snake Creek Preservation Society, The Nature Conservancy and the Utah Division of Parks and Recreation. Additional purchases increased the protected lands to 917 acres.

Although Snake Creek only contributes 20% of the water flows in the Provo River, arsenic and other trace elements picked up by the creek increase concentrations in the river four-fold. Phosphate and nitrate pollution from dairy cattle and farms along lower Snake Creek significantly polluted the lower Middle Provo and Deer Creek Reservoir but underwent major clean-up in the 1980s.

== See also ==
- Wasatch Mountain State Park
