= American Fork Canyon =

Canyon in the Wasatch Mountains, Utah

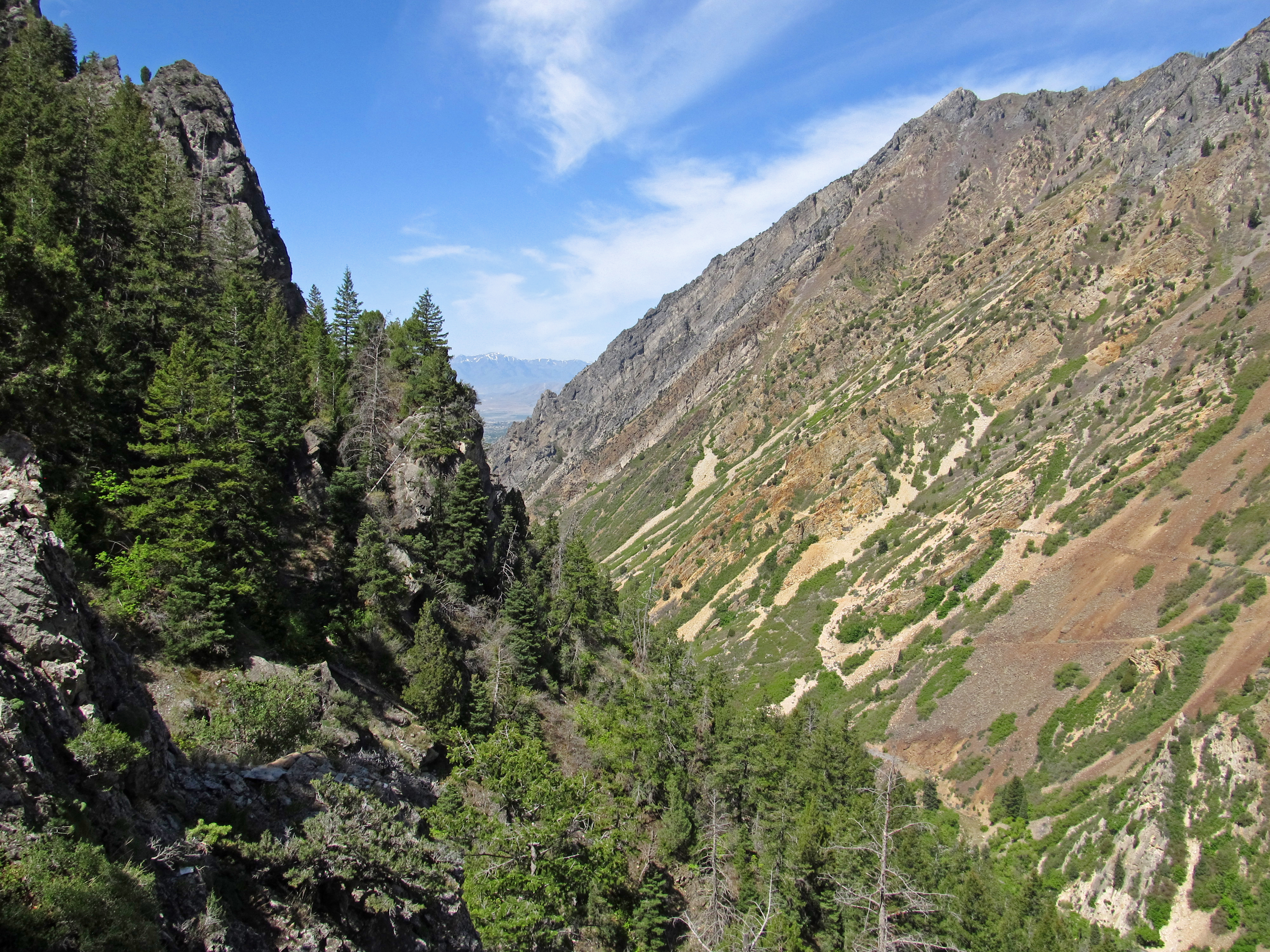
- View down the canyon to Utah Valley from the entrance of Timpanogos Cave

- Location within Utah Location within the United States
- Elevation: 8,000 ft (2,400 m)

Third Approach
- Location: Utah County
- Range: Wasatch Mountains
- Coordinates: 40.4336°N 111.7391°W

American Fork Canyon is a canyon in the Wasatch Mountains of Utah, United States. The canyon is famous for the Timpanogos Cave National Monument, which resides on its south side. It is named after the American Fork River, which runs through the bottom of the canyon.

The area is accessed by State Route 92, through what is officially called the "Alpine Loop Scenic Byway." Visitors entering American Fork Canyon from the west can follow SR-92 up the canyon to the summit of the Alpine Loop, down the east side of Mount Timpanogos, past Sundance Ski Resort and then out into Provo Canyon to the south. Spurs off SR-92 take visitors to Tibble Fork Reservoir and Cascade Springs. A paved road continues east from Cascade Springs to Midway.

This area is home to many hiking, biking, and equestrian trails with several established campgrounds. Tibble Fork Reservoir and Silver Lake Flats Reservoir are popular camping and fishing spots in the summer as well as offering excellent snowmobiling, snowshoeing, cross-country skiing, and backcountry skiing during the winter months.

== Recreation Fee Demonstration Project to Federal Lands Recreation Enhancement Act ==
American Fork Canyon was part of the Recreation Fee Demonstration Project pilot project, which has become the Federal Lands Recreation Enhancement Act 2005. The fees collected at the information stations remain in the area to improve visitor services, maintain recreation facilities, enhance wildlife habitat, and protect natural resources. As of December 1, 2023 fees for the canyon are as follows

- $10.00 per vehicle for three days
- $20.00 per vehicle for seven days
- $60.00 per vehicle for an annual pass

The Uinta-Wasatch-Cache National Forest passes, America the Beautiful Federal Recreational Lands passes are valid at recreation fee sites across the Uinta-Wasatch-Cache National Forest including sites in American Fork Canyon and Mirror Lake Recreation Corridor. Beginning in 2013, visitors going just to Timpanogos Cave National Monument are not required to pay the recreation fee to the canyon (unless other recreational facilities are also utilized). There is no fee for non-stop travel on SR-92, "Timpanogos Hwy", "Alpine Scenic Loop", or non-stop travel on SR-114 "Cascade Springs Scenic Backway" into Midway, UT. Concessionaire operated campgrounds and day use fees are separate. You do not need a recreation pass unless you are visiting a recreation site outside of your campground that requires one.

== Native American pictographs and artifacts ==
American fork canyon is home to several Native American pictographs, created by the Fremont people. They are several thousand years old and can be found along rock faces and walls lining the canyon. Additional artifacts from the Fremont people and other later Native American groups, spearpoints, grindstones, and arrowheads have been found in minor caves along the canyon, suggesting that hunters used these caves as temporary homes or base camps for hunting.

== American Fork Canyon camping sites ==
- Altamont
- Granite Flat
- Holman Flat
- Little Mill
- Mount Timpanogos
- North Mill
- Salamander Flat
- Theatre-in-the-Pines
- Timpooneke

== See also ==
- List of canyons and gorges in Utah
- Lone Peak Fire District
