= American Fork (river) =

River in Utah County, Utah, United States

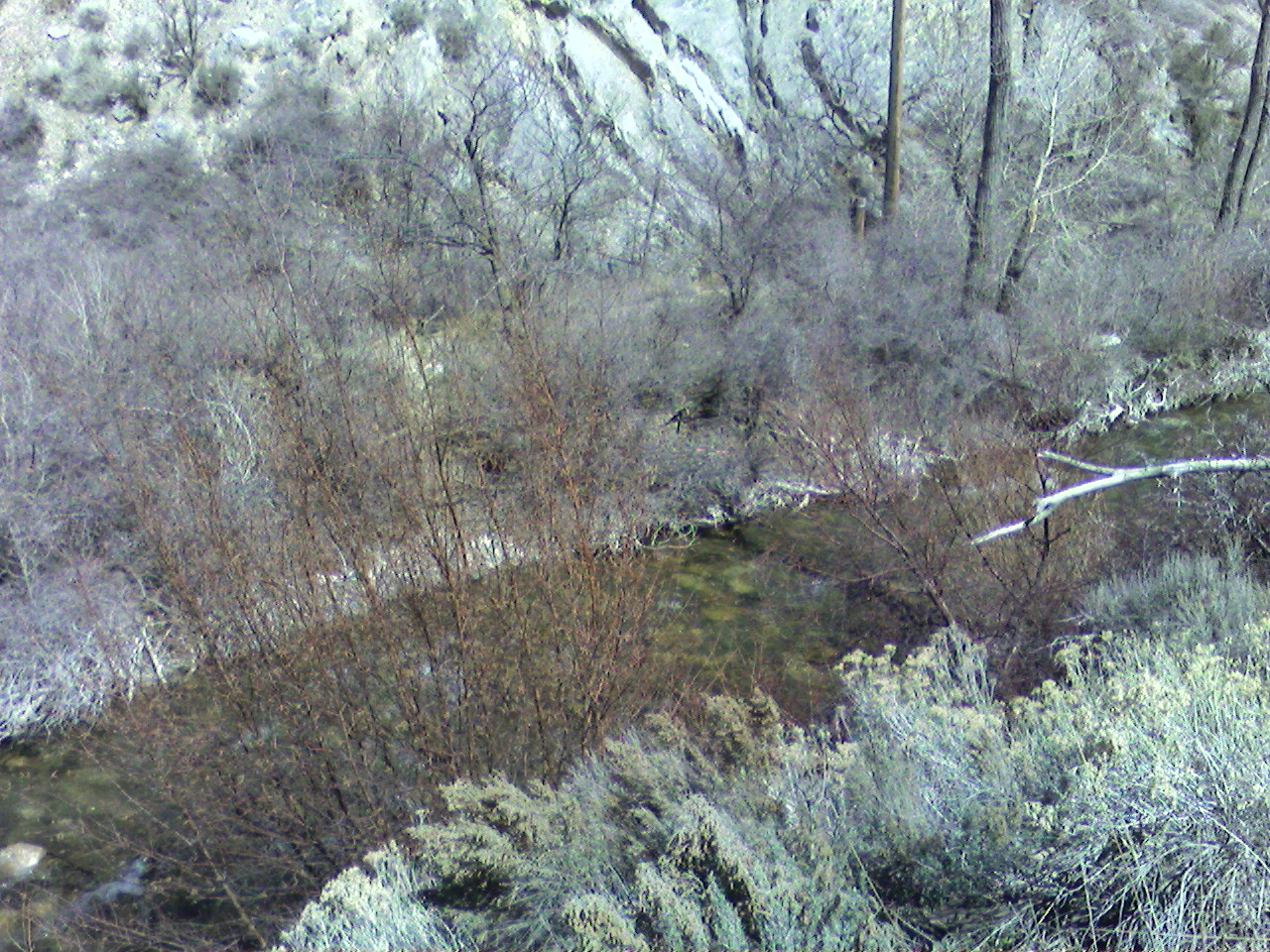
- The American Fork near the mouth of American Fork Canyon, March 2007

- Location of American Fork River American Fork (river) (the United States)
- Etymology: To differentiate from the Spanish Fork; or derived from a company name.

Location
- Country: United States
- State: Utah
- County: Utah

Physical characteristics
- Source: Unnamed stream flowing through the American Fork Canyon
  - coordinates: 40°25′54″N 111°38′12″W
- Mouth: Utah Lake
  - location: south of American Fork (city)
  - coordinates: 40°20′33″N 111°45′36″W
  - elevation: 4,495 feet (1,370 m)

Basin features
- Progression: Utah Lake – Jordan River – Great Salt Lake

The American Fork (commonly known as the American Fork River) is a river in Utah County, Utah, United States.

== Description ==
The river rises at the head of American Fork Canyon in the Wasatch Mountains about 35 miles (56 km) southeast of Salt Lake City. The unnamed stream, which is the source of the American Fork, flows from Mineral Basin, through the length of the American Fork Canyon and has several named tributaries (Silver Creek, Deer Creek, and Cattle Creek). The river runs through northern Utah County and empties into Utah Lake on its north shore.

The city of American Fork is named after this river. The description "American" in the river's name is to distinguish it from the Spanish Fork (river) that also originates in the Wasatch Range; alternatively, it could have been named after the American Fur Company.

Fly fishermen commonly target smaller rainbow trout (measuring 6–12 in.) – and to a lesser extent brown trout – in the river during summer and fall, when strong runoff and snowfall do not limit access.

In addition to fish, a rich community of mayflies, stoneflies, and caddisflies is also present in the American Fork river.

== Groundwater contribution of metals to the river ==
The abandoned Pacific Mine adjacent to the North Fork of the river has been a source of metals that enter the river when it is gaining stream. Spill events contributing toxic metals to the river have deemed waters dangerous to humans at times, but work has also been done by the U.S. Forest Service to remove tailings from mining sites.

== See also ==
- List of rivers of Utah
