= 2020 United States House of Representatives elections in Utah =

- November 3, 2020

All 4 Utah seats to the United States House of Representatives
	Majority party	Minority party
Party	Republican	Democratic
Last election	3	1
Seats won	4	0
Seat change	▲1	▼1
Popular vote	873,347	505,946
Percentage	60.98%	35.33%
Swing	▲2.33%	▼0.21%

Republican
40–50%
50–60%
60–70%
70–80%
80–90%
>90%
Democratic
40–50%
50–60%

The 2020 United States House of Representatives elections in Utah were held on November 3, 2020, to elect the four U.S. representatives from the state of Utah, one from each of the state's four congressional districts. The elections coincided with the 2020 U.S. presidential election, as well as other elections to the House of Representatives, elections to the United States Senate, and various state and local elections.

== Overview ==
Registered voters: 1,682,512. Turnout: 1,515,845 (90.09%)

Party	Candi- dates	Votes		Seats	
Party	Candi- dates	No.	%	No.	+/–
Republican Party	4	873,347	60.98%	4	▲1
Democratic Party	4	505,946	35.33%	0	▼1
Libertarian Party	2	28,518	1.99%	0	Steady
United Utah	2	15,077	1.05%	0	Steady
Constitution Party	1	8,889	0.62%	0	Steady
Total	13	1,432,232	100.0%	4	Steady

Popular vote
Republican	60.98%
Democratic	35.33%
Other	3.7%

House seats
Republican	100%

=== By district ===
District	Republican		Democratic		Others		Total		Result
District	Votes	%	Votes	%	Votes	%	Votes	%	Result
District 1	237,988	69.52%	104,194	30.43%	169	0.05%	342,351	100%	Republican hold
District 2	208,997	59.0%	129,762	36.63%	15,465	4.37%	354,224	100%	Republican hold
District 3	246,674	68.73%	96,067	26.77%	16,186	4.51%	358,927	100%	Republican hold
District 4	179,688	47.70%	175,923	46.70%	21,119	5.6%	376,730	100%	Republican gain
Total	873,347	60.98%	505,946	35.33%	52,939	3.7%	1,432,232	100%	

== District 1 ==
2020 Utah's 1st congressional district election
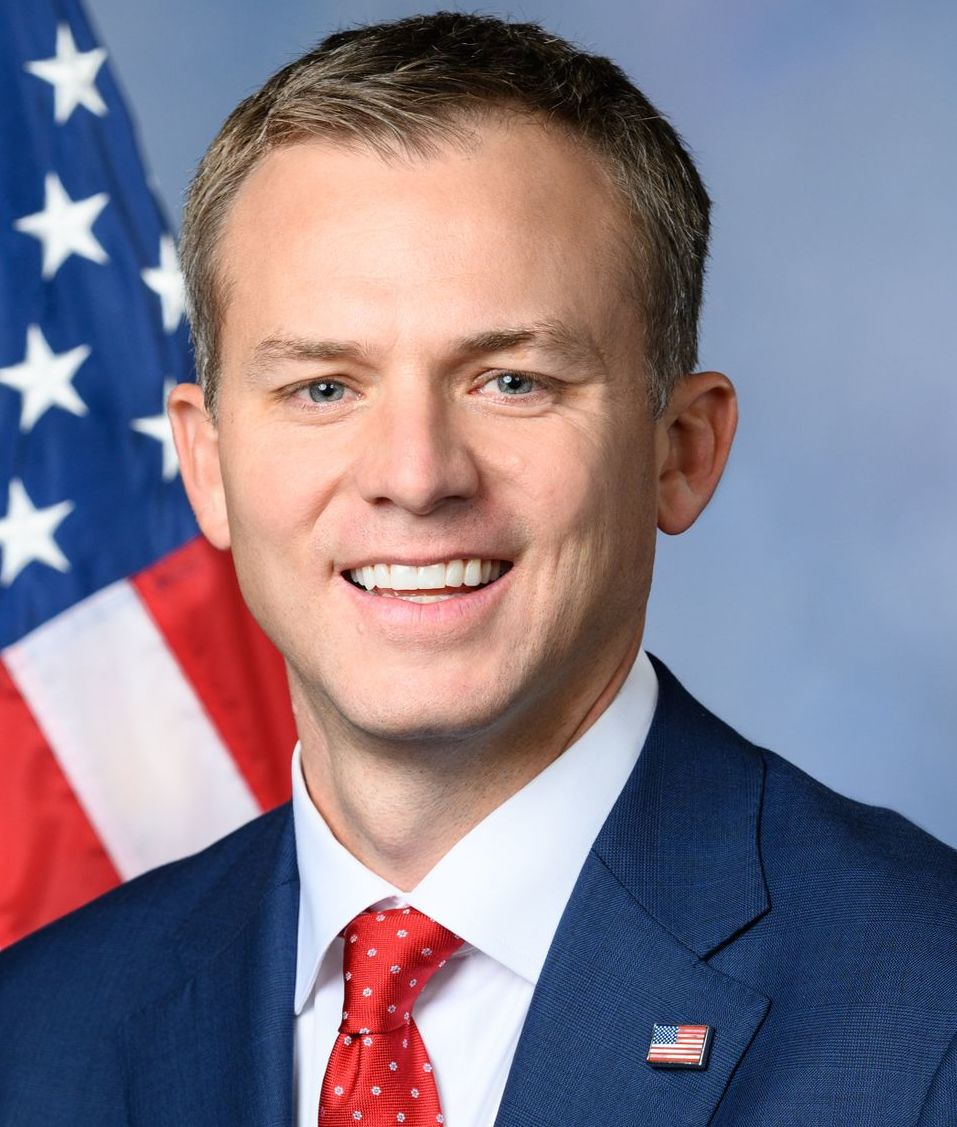

Nominee	Blake Moore	Darren Parry
Party	Republican	Democratic
Popular vote	237,988	104,194
Percentage	69.5%	30.4%
- County results Moore: 60–70% 70–80% 80–90% Parry: 50–60%
U.S. Representative before election
Rob Bishop
Republican
Elected U.S. Representative
Blake Moore
Republican

The 1st district is located in northern Utah, including the cities of Ogden, Logan, Park City, Layton, Clearfield, and the northern half of the Great Salt Lake. The incumbent was Republican Rob Bishop, who was re-elected with 61.6% of the vote in 2018, and announced in August 2017 that this term would be his final term.

=== Republican primary ===
==== Candidates ====
===== Declared =====
- Tina Cannon, Morgan County councilwoman
- J.C. DeYoung
- Doug Durbano, businessman and lawyer
- Chadwick Fairbanks, property manager
- Kerry Gibson, Utah Commissioner of Agriculture and Food and former Weber County commissioner
- Catherine Brenchley Hammon
- Zach Hartman, real estate investment advisor
- Blake Moore, former U.S. foreign service officer
- Mark Shepherd, mayor of Clearfield
- Bob Stevenson, Davis County commissioner
- Howard Wallack, retired business executive
- Katie Witt, mayor of Kaysville and former Longmont city councilwoman

===== Declined =====
- Rob Bishop, incumbent U.S. representative
- Francis Gibson, majority leader of the Utah House of Representatives
- F. Ann Millner, state senator
- Mike Schultz, majority whip of the Utah House of Representatives
- Chris Stewart, incumbent U.S. representative (for the 2nd district)
- Stan Summers, Box Elder County commissioner
- Todd Weiler, state senator
- Logan Wilde, state representative
- Brad Wilson, speaker of the Utah House of Representatives

==== Endorsements ====
Katie Witt

Organizations

- Susan B. Anthony List

==== Convention results ====
Republican convention results
Candidate	Round 1		Round 2		Round 3		Round 4		Round 5		Round 6		Round 7		Round 8		Round 9		Round 10		Round 11	
Candidate	Votes	%	Votes	%	Votes	%	Votes	%	Votes	%	Votes	%	Votes	%	Votes	%	Votes	%	Votes	%	Votes	%
Kerry Gibson	248	25.7%	248	25.7%	248	25.7%	252	26.2%	253	26.3%	260	27.0%	269	28.1%	292	30.7%	329	34.9%	404	43.4%	514	57.0%
Blake Moore	166	17.2%	166	17.2%	166	17.2%	166	17.2%	167	17.4%	176	18.3%	182	19.0%	200	21.0%	221	23.4%	270	29.0%	388	43.0%
Tina Cannon	136	14.1%	136	14.1%	137	14.2%	138	14.3%	140	14.6%	150	15.6%	160	16.7%	174	18.3%	215	22.8%	256	27.5%	Eliminated	
Doug Durbano	130	13.5%	130	13.5%	131	13.6%	132	13.7%	139	14.4%	142	14.8%	143	14.9%	151	15.9%	179	19.0%	Eliminated			
Howard Wallack	106	11.0%	106	11.0%	106	11.0%	107	11.1%	108	11.2%	117	12.2%	126	13.2%	135	14.2%	Eliminated					
Bob Stevenson	61	6.3%	61	6.3%	61	6.3%	62	6.4%	62	6.4%	67	7.0%	77	8.0%	Eliminated							
Mark Shepherd	45	4.7%	45	4.7%	45	4.7%	46	4.8%	47	4.9%	50	5.2%	Eliminated									
Katie Witt	46	4.8%	46	4.8%	46	4.8%	46	4.8%	46	4.8%	Eliminated											
Chadwick Fairbanks	14	1.5%	14	1.5%	14	1.5%	14	1.5%	Eliminated													
Zach Hartman	10	1.0%	10	1.0%	10	1.0%	Eliminated															
JC DeYoung	2	0.2%	2	0.2%	Eliminated																	
Catherine Hammon	0	0.0%	Eliminated																			
Inactive Ballots	0 ballots		0 ballots		0 ballots		1 ballots		2 ballots		2 ballots		7 ballots		12 ballots		20 ballots		34 ballots		62 ballots	

==== Polling ====
Poll source	Date(s) administered	Sample size (Note: Key: A – all adults RV – registered voters LV – likely voters V – unclear)	Margin of error	Tina Cannon	Douglas Durbano	Kerry Gibson	Catherine Hammon	Blake Moore	Mark Shepherd	Bob Stevenson	Katie Witt	Other	Undecided
Global Strategy Group (Note: Poll sponsored by Moore's campaign)	June 18–20, 2020	834 (LV)	± 3.7%	–	–	15%	–	25%	–	23%	12%	–	25%
Dan Jones & Associates	June 2–9, 2020	417 (LV)	± 5%	–	–	13%	–	16%	–	16%	7%	–	48%
Y2 Analytics	May 16–18, 2020	127 (LV)	± 8.7%	–	–	20%	–	16%	–	38%	26%	–	–
Y2 Analytics	March 21–30, 2020	103 (LV)	± 9.7%	8%	11%	7%	12%	6%	13%	25%	17%	> 1% (Note: JC DeYoung with 1%; Chadwick Fairbanks and Zach Hartman with < 1%)	–

==== Debate ====
2020 Utah's 1st congressional district Republican primary debate
No.	Date	Host	Moderator	Link	Republican	Republican	Republican	Republican
Key: P Participant A Absent N Not invited I Invited W Withdrawn								
Key: P Participant A Absent N Not invited I Invited W Withdrawn					Kerry Gibson	Blake Moore	Bob Stevenson	Katie Witt
1	Jun. 2, 2020	Utah Debate Commission	Rod Arquette		P	P	P	P

==== Primary results ====
Republican primary results
Party	Candidate	Votes	%
Republican	Blake Moore	39,260	31.0
Republican	Bob Stevenson	36,288	28.6
Republican	Kerry Gibson	29,991	23.6
Republican	Katie Witt	21,317	16.8
Total votes		126,856	100.0

=== Democratic primary ===
==== Candidates ====
===== Declared =====
- Jamie Cheek, college debate coach and rehabilitation counselor
- Darren Parry, chairman of the Northwestern Band of the Shoshone Nation

==== Convention results ====
Democratic convention results
Candidate	Pct.
Darren Parry	55.6%
Jamie Cheek	44.4%

==== Polling ====
Polls with a sample size of <100 are marked in red to indicate a lack of reliability.

Poll source	Date(s) administered	Sample size	Margin of error	Jamie Cheek	Darren Parry
Y2 Analytics	March 21–30, 2020	29 (LV)	± 18.2%	42%	58%

==== Debate ====
2020 Utah's 1st congressional district Democratic primary debate
No.	Date	Host	Moderator	Link	Democratic	Democratic
Key: P Participant A Absent N Not invited I Invited W Withdrawn						
Key: P Participant A Absent N Not invited I Invited W Withdrawn					Jamie Cheek	Darren Parry
1	Jun. 1, 2020	Utah Debate Commission	Rod Arquette		P	P

==== Primary results ====
Democratic primary results
Party	Candidate	Votes	%
Democratic	Darren Parry	11,667	50.9
Democratic	Jamie Cheek	11,242	49.1
Total votes		22,909	100.0

=== General election ===
==== Debate ====
2020 Utah's 1st congressional district debate
No.	Date	Host	Moderator	Link	Republican	Democratic
Key: P Participant A Absent N Not invited I Invited W Withdrawn						
Key: P Participant A Absent N Not invited I Invited W Withdrawn					Blake Moore	Darren Parry
1	Sep. 24, 2020	Utah Debate Commission	Rod Arquette		P	P

==== Predictions ====
Source	Ranking	As of
The Cook Political Report	Safe R	July 2, 2020
Inside Elections	Safe R	June 2, 2020
Sabato's Crystal Ball	Safe R	July 2, 2020
Politico	Safe R	April 19, 2020
Daily Kos	Safe R	June 3, 2020
RCP	Safe R	June 9, 2020
Niskanen	Safe R	June 7, 2020

==== Polling ====
Poll source	Date(s) administered	Sample size	Margin of error	Blake Moore (R)	Darren Parry (D)	Other	Undecided
Lighthouse Research	August 31 – September 12, 2020	500 (RV)	± 4.38%	49%	22%	1% (Note: "Other" with 1%)	28%

Hypothetical polling

with Generic Republican and Generic Democrat

Poll source	Date(s) administered	Sample size	Margin of error	Generic Republican	Generic Democrat	Other	Undecided
Y2 Analytics/UtahPolicy.com/KUTV 2	Mar 21–30, 2020	268 (LV)	–	48%	24%	5% (Note: "Someone else" with 4%; "other" with 1%)	23%
Y2 Analytics/UtahPolicy/KUTV 2 News	Jan 16–30, 2020	551 (LV)	± (4% – 4.2%)	47%	22%	12% (Note: "Someone else" with 9%; "other" with 3%)	20%
Y2 Analytics/UtahPolicy/KUTV 2 News	Sep 25 – October 8, 2019	198 (LV)	–	42%	21%	17% (Note: "Third party candidate" with 15%; "other" with 2%)	21%
Y2 Analytics/UtahPolicy/KUTV 2 News	Jun 27 – July 17, 2019	554 (LV)	–	45%	20%	14% (Note: "Third party candidate" with 11%; "other" with 3%)	22%

==== Results ====
Utah's 1st congressional district, 2020
Party	Candidate	Votes	%
Republican	Blake Moore	237,988	69.5
Democratic	Darren Parry	104,194	30.4
Write-in		169	0.1
Total votes		342,351	100.0
Republican hold			

== District 2 ==
2020 Utah's 2nd congressional district election
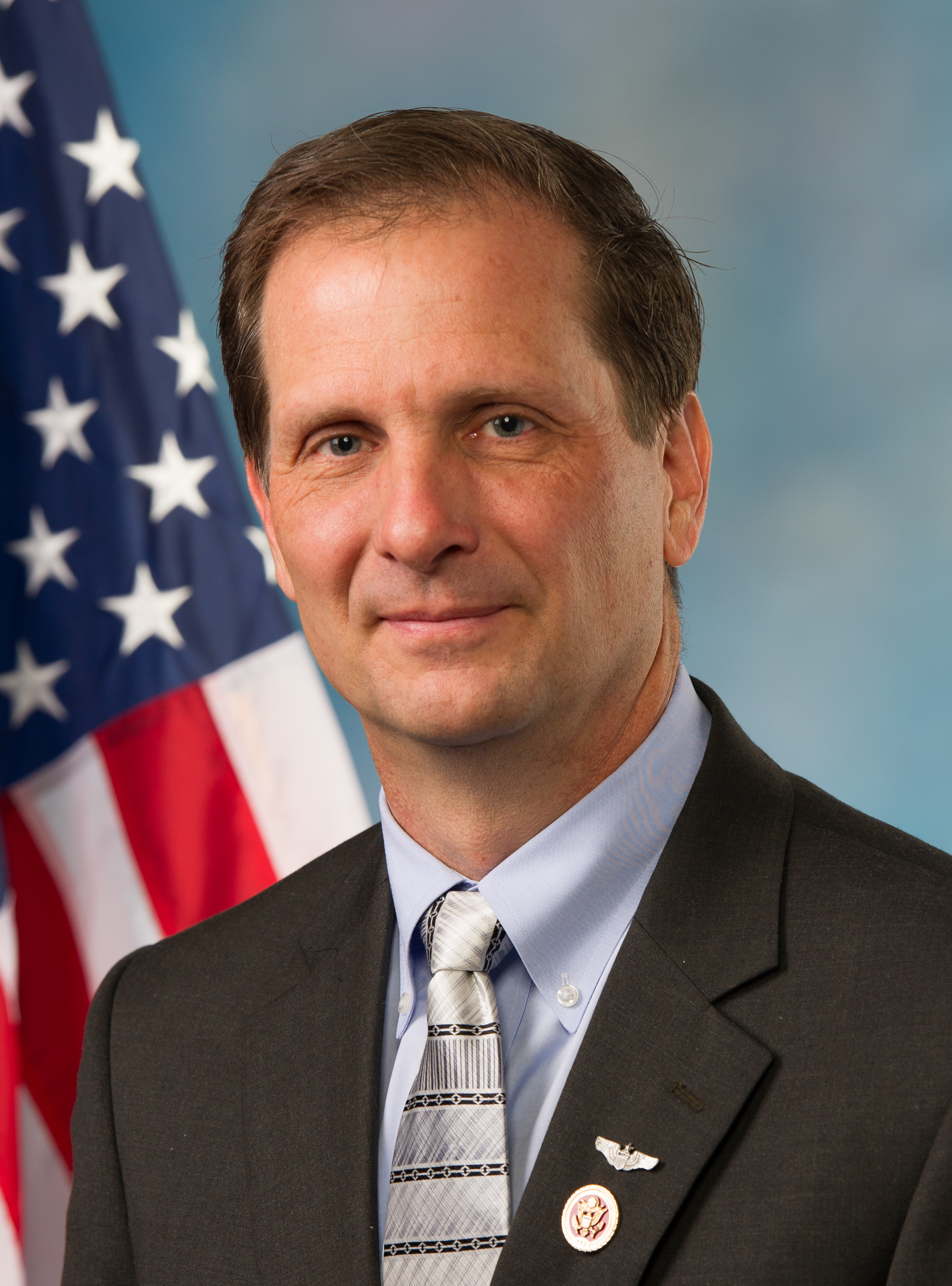

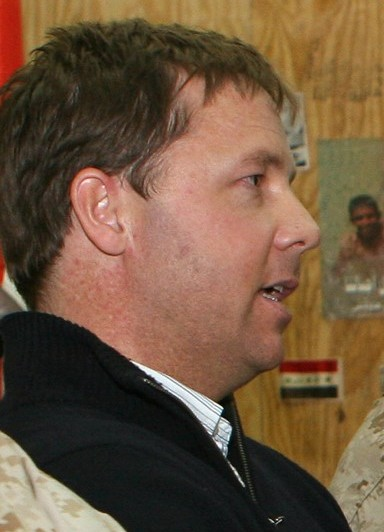
Nominee	Chris Stewart	Kael Weston
Party	Republican	Democratic
Popular vote	208,997	129,762
Percentage	59.0%	36.6%
- County results Stewart: 60–70% 70–80% 80–90% >90% Weston: 60–70%
U.S. Representative before election
Chris Stewart
Republican
Elected U.S. Representative
Chris Stewart
Republican

The 2nd district encompasses both Salt Lake City and the rural western and southern parts of the state. The incumbent was Republican Chris Stewart, who was re-elected with 56.1% of the vote in 2018.

=== Republican primary ===
==== Candidates ====
===== Declared =====
- Chris Stewart, incumbent U.S. representative

===== Eliminated at convention =====
- Mary Burkett, candidate for Utah House of Representatives in 2012 and for Utah's 2nd congressional district in 2018
- Ty Jensen, political podcaster and 2018 candidate for United States Senate
- Carson Jorgensen, farmer

==== Polling ====
Poll source	Date(s) administered	Sample size	Margin of error	Mark Burkett	Ty Jensen	Carson Jorgensen	Chris Stewart
Y2 Analytics	March 21–30, 2020	175 (LV)	–	17%	6%	4%	73%

=== Democratic primary ===
==== Candidates ====
===== Declared =====
- Kael Weston, college professor and former U.S. State Department official

===== Eliminated at convention =====
- Randy Hopkins, retired Utah Department of Workforce Services regional director and candidate for this district in 2018
- Larry Livingston, former IRS agent

==== Polling ====
Polls with a sample size of <100 are marked in red to indicate a lack of reliability.

Poll source	Date(s) administered	Sample size	Margin of error	Randy Hopkins	Larry Livingston	Kael Weston
Y2 Analytics	March 21–30, 2020	59 (LV)	–	41%	19%	40%

=== General election ===
==== Debate ====
2020 Utah's 2nd congressional district debate
No.	Date	Host	Moderator	Link	Republican	Democratic	Libertarian
Key: P Participant A Absent N Not invited I Invited W Withdrawn							
Key: P Participant A Absent N Not invited I Invited W Withdrawn					Chris Stewart	Kael Weston	Rob Latham
1	Oct. 19, 2020	Utah Debate Commission	Pat Jones		P	P	P

==== Predictions ====
Source	Ranking	As of
The Cook Political Report	Safe R	July 2, 2020
Inside Elections	Safe R	June 2, 2020
Sabato's Crystal Ball	Safe R	July 2, 2020
Politico	Safe R	April 19, 2020
Daily Kos	Safe R	June 3, 2020
RCP	Safe R	June 9, 2020
Niskanen	Safe R	June 7, 2020

==== Polling ====
Poll source	Date(s) administered	Sample size	Margin of error	Chris Stewart (R)	Kael Weston (D)	Rob Latham (L)	Other	Undecided
Lighthouse Research	August 31 – September 12, 2020	500 (RV)	± 4.38%	48%	28%	7%	0%	17%

Hypothetical polling

with Generic Republican and Generic Democrat

Poll source	Date(s) administered	Sample size	Margin of error	Generic Republican	Generic Democrat	Other	Undecided
Y2 Analytics/UtahPolicy.com/KUTV 2	March 21–30, 2020	342 (LV)	–	41%	33%	8% (Note: "Someone else" with 7%; "other" with 1%)	17%
Y2 Analytics/UtahPolicy/KUTV 2 News	January 16–30, 2020	558 (LV)	± (4% – 4.2%)	38%	36%	11% (Note: "Someone else" with 7%; "other" with 4%)	15%
Y2 Analytics	September 25 – October 8, 2019	267 (LV)	–	45%	37%	7% (Note: "Third party candidate" with 5%; "other" with 2%)	11%
Y2 Analytics	June 27 – July 17, 2019	689 (LV)	–	37%	36%	12% (Note: "Third party candidate" with 7%; "other" with 5%)	15%

==== Results ====
Utah's 2nd congressional district, 2020
Party	Candidate	Votes	%
Republican	Chris Stewart (incumbent)	208,997	59.0
Democratic	Kael Weston	129,762	36.6
Libertarian	Rob Latham	15,465	4.4
Total votes		354,224	100.0
Republican hold			

== District 3 ==
2020 Utah's 3rd congressional district election
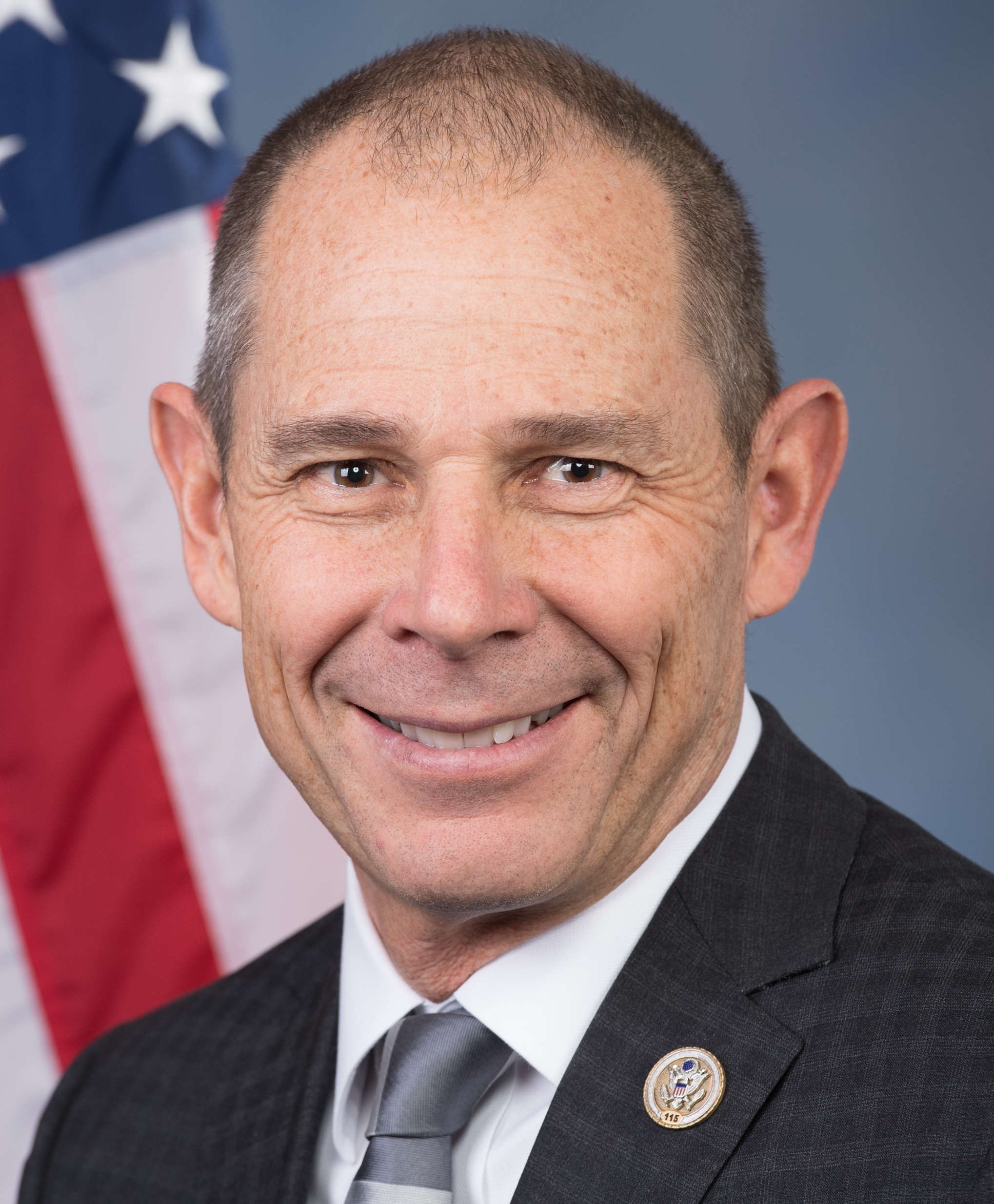

Nominee	John Curtis	Devin Thorpe
Party	Republican	Democratic
Popular vote	246,674	96,067
Percentage	68.8%	26.8%
- County results Curtis: 50–60% 60–70% 70–80% 80–90% Thorpe: 40–50%
U.S. Representative before election
John Curtis
Republican
Elected U.S. Representative
John Curtis
Republican

The 3rd district includes rural southeastern Utah, stretches into the Provo-Orem metro area, and takes in the southeastern Salt Lake City suburbs of Holladay, Cottonwood Heights, Sandy, and Draper. The incumbent was Republican John Curtis, who was re-elected with 67.5% of the vote in 2018.

=== Republican primary ===
==== Candidates ====
===== Declared =====
- John Curtis, incumbent U.S. representative

==== Polling ====
Poll source	Date(s) administered	Sample size	Margin of error	Tim Alders	John Curtis
Y2 Analytics	March 21–30, 2020	184 (LV)	–	22%	78%

=== Democratic primary ===
==== Candidates ====
===== Declared =====
- Devin D. Thorpe, nonprofit founder

===== Eliminated at convention =====
- Jared Anderson
- Trey Robinson

==== Polling ====
Polls with a sample size of <100 are marked in red to indicate a lack of reliability.

Poll source	Date(s) administered	Sample size	Margin of error	Jared Anderson	Tray Robinson	Devin Thorpe
Y2 Analytics	March 21–30, 2020	37 (LV)	–	37%	21%	42%

=== Independents ===
==== Candidates ====
===== Withdrew =====
- Russel Fugal, former Utah Republican Party delegate

=== General election ===
==== Debate ====
2020 Utah's 3rd congressional district debate
No.	Date	Host	Moderator	Link	Republican	Democratic
Key: P Participant A Absent N Not invited I Invited W Withdrawn						
Key: P Participant A Absent N Not invited I Invited W Withdrawn					John Curtis	Devin Thorpe
1	Oct. 15, 2020	Utah Debate Commission	David Magleby		P	P

==== Predictions ====
Source	Ranking	As of
The Cook Political Report	Safe R	July 2, 2020
Inside Elections	Safe R	June 2, 2020
Sabato's Crystal Ball	Safe R	July 2, 2020
Politico	Safe R	April 19, 2020
Daily Kos	Safe R	June 3, 2020
RCP	Safe R	June 9, 2020
Niskanen	Safe R	June 7, 2020

==== Polling ====
Poll source	Date(s) administered	Sample size	Margin of error	John Curtis (R)	Devin Thorpe (D)	Other	Undecided
Lighthouse Research	August 31 – September 12, 2020	500 (RV)	± 4.38%	51%	20%	5% (Note: McNeill (UUP) with 3%; Cummings (C) with 2%; "Other" with 0%)	24%

Hypothetical polling

with Generic Republican and Generic Democrat

Poll source	Date(s) administered	Sample size	Margin of error	Generic Republican	Generic Democrat	Other	Undecided
Y2 Analytics	March 21–30, 2020	354 (LV)	–	46%	29%	4% (Note: "Someone else" and "other" with 2%)	21%
Y2 Analytics	January 16–30, 2020	570 (LV)	± (4% – 4.2%)	48%	23%	8% (Note: "Someone else" with 5%; "other" with 3%)	21%
Y2 Analytics	September 25 – October 8, 2019	227 (LV)	–	46%	22%	16% (Note: "Third party candidate" with 10%; "other" with 6%)	16%
Y2 Analytics	June 27 – July 17, 2019	568 (LV)	–	43%	21%	14% (Note: "Third party candidate" with 10%; "other" with 4%)	22%

==== Results ====
Utah's 3rd congressional district, 2020
Party	Candidate	Votes	%
Republican	John Curtis (incumbent)	246,674	68.8
Democratic	Devin Thorpe	96,067	26.8
Constitution	Daniel Clyde Cummings	8,889	2.5
United Utah	Thomas G. McNeill	7,040	2.0
Write-in		257	0.1
Total votes		358,927	100.0
Republican hold			

== District 4 ==
2020 Utah's 4th congressional district election
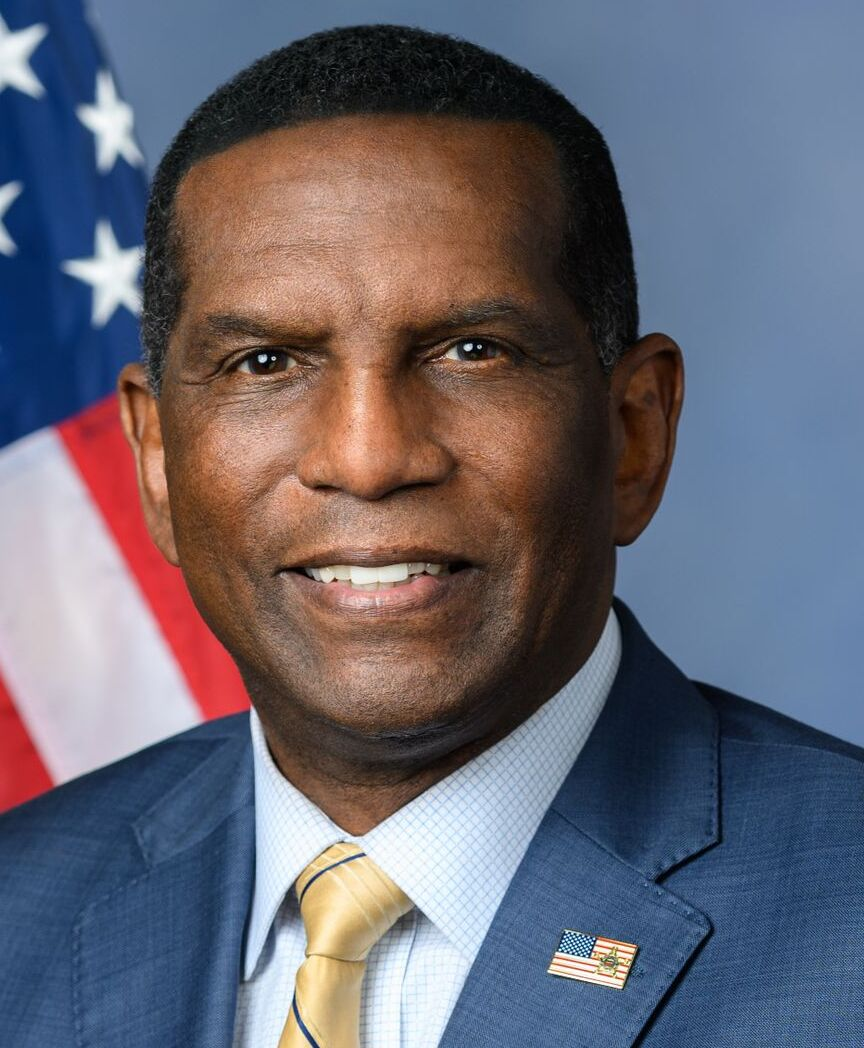

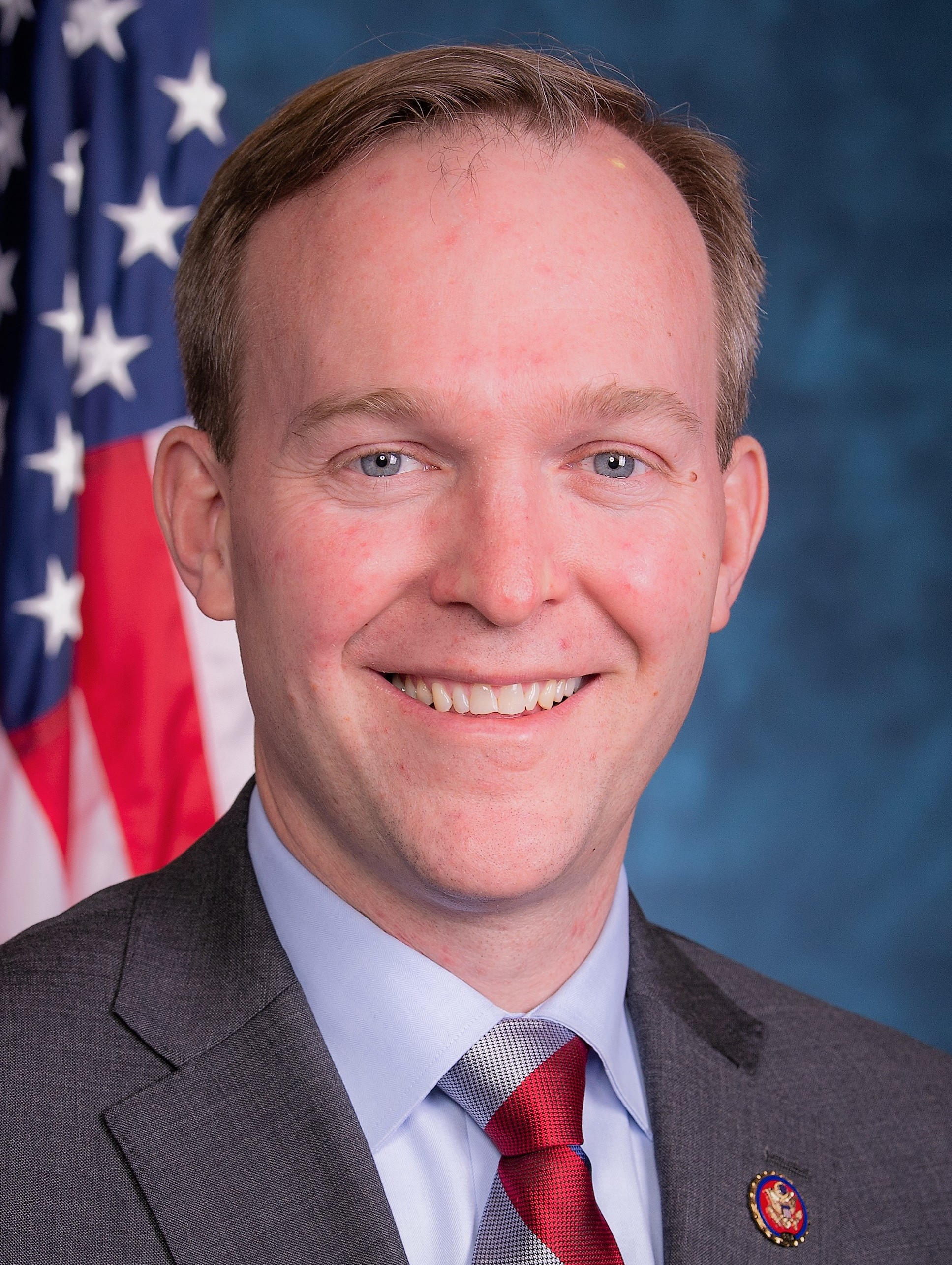
Nominee	Burgess Owens	Ben McAdams
Party	Republican	Democratic
Popular vote	179,688	175,923
Percentage	47.7%	46.7%
- County results Owens: 60–70% 70–80% 80–90% McAdams: 50–60%
U.S. Representative before election
Ben McAdams
Democratic
Elected U.S. Representative
Burgess Owens
Republican

The 4th district is based in southwest Salt Lake County, taking in parts of West Valley City and Salt Lake City, as well as South Salt Lake, Taylorsville, Murray, West Jordan, Midvale, South Jordan, Riverton, Herriman, and Bluffdale. The district also stretches south into eastern Utah County, western Juab County, and northern Sanpete County. The incumbent was Democrat Ben McAdams, who flipped the district and was elected with 50.1% of the vote in 2018. On November 17 the election was called for Burgess Owens, with a margin of less than 1%. Owens won the election by overperforming in traditionally Democratic Salt Lake County, and he ultimately defeated McAdams by 3,765 votes, a larger margin than McAdams won by in 2018. The election was one of the closest House races in the country in 2020, and was not officially called until thirteen days after Election Day.

=== Democratic primary ===
==== Candidates ====
===== Declared =====
- Ben McAdams, incumbent U.S. representative

===== Defeated at convention =====
- Daniel Beckstrand, dental office manager

==== Endorsements ====
Ben McAdams

Unions

- Utah AFL–CIO

Organizations

- End Citizens United
- Human Rights Campaign
- League of Conservation Voters Action Fund
- National Committee to Preserve Social Security and Medicare

=== Republican primary ===
==== Candidates ====
===== Declared =====
- Kathleen Anderson, communications director for the Utah Republican Party
- Chris Biesinger, family nurse practitioner and Utah National Guardsman
- Trent Christensen, CEO of venture capitalist firm and former regional finance director for Mitt Romney's 2012 presidential campaign
- Kim Coleman, state representative
- Jay McFarland, radio personality
- Burgess Owens, former NFL player and CEO of Second Chance 4 Youth
- Cindy Thompson

===== Withdrawn =====
- Dan Hemmert, state senate majority whip

===== Declined =====
- Dan McCay, state senator (running for lieutenant governor of Utah)
- Aimee Winder Newton, Salt Lake County councilwoman (running for governor of Utah)

==== Endorsements ====
Kim Coleman

State officials

- Justin Fawson, former state representative (2014–2018)
- David Lifferth, former state representative
- Karianne Lisonbee, state representative
- Jefferson Moss, state representative

Organizations

- NRA Political Victory Fund
- Susan B. Anthony List

==== Polling ====
Poll source	Date(s) administered	Sample size	Margin of error	Kathleen Anderson	Chris Biesinger	Trent Christensen	Kim Coleman	Jay McFarland	Burgess Owens	Cindy Thompson	Undecided
Y2 Analytics	May 16–18, 2020	148 (LV)	± 8.1%	–	–	13%	23%	28%	36%	–	–
Hinckley Institute	April 19–24, 2020	352 (LV)	± 5.2%	6%	3%	4%	4%	8%	6%	2%	67%
Y2 Analytics	March 21–30, 2020	112 (LV)	± 9.3%	17%	6%	6%	17%	31%	22%	1%	

Hypothetical polling

with Dan Hemmert, and Jefferson Moss

Poll source	Date(s) administered	Sample size	Margin of error	Kathleen Anderson	Kim Coleman	Dan Hemmert	Jay McFarland	Jefferson Moss	Other	Undecided
Remington Research Group (R)	October 5–6, 2019	– (LV) (Note: Not yet released)	–	5%	4%	2%	17%	–	9% (Note: "Someone else" with 7%; Burgess Owens with 2%)	65%
Echleon Insights (R) (Note: Poll sponsored by Kathleen Anderson campaign.)	July 17–21, 2019	400 (LV)	± 4.9%	2%	3%	1%	7%	2%	–	85%

=== Convention results ===
US House of Representatives-District 4
Candidate	Round 1		Round 2		Round 3		Round 4		Round 5		Round 6	
Candidate	Votes	%	Votes	%	Votes	%	Votes	%	Votes	%	Votes	%
Kim Coleman	324	43.4%	324	43.4%	332	44.6%	348	46.7%	365	49.3%	402	54.5%
Burgess Owens	211	28.3%	212	28.4%	218	29.3%	237	31.8%	268	36.2%	335	45.5%
Jay 'JayMac' McFarland	75	10.1%	75	10.1%	79	10.6%	97	13.0%	107	14.5%	Eliminated	
Kathleen Anderson	53	7.1%	54	7.2%	60	8.1%	63	8.5%	Eliminated			
Trent Christensen	51	6.8%	51	6.8%	56	7.5%	Eliminated					
James Christian Biesinger II	29	3.9%	30	4.0%	Eliminated							
Cindy Thompson	3	0.4%	Eliminated									
Inactive Ballots	0 ballots		0 ballots		1 ballots		1 ballots		6 ballots		9 ballots	

==== Debate ====
2020 Utah's 4th congressional district Republican primary debate
No.	Date	Host	Moderator	Link	Republican	Republican	Republican	Republican
Key: P Participant A Absent N Not invited I Invited W Withdrawn								
Key: P Participant A Absent N Not invited I Invited W Withdrawn					Trent Christensen	Kim Coleman	Jay McFarland	Burgess Owens
1	Jun. 1, 2020	Utah Debate Commission	Jennifer Napier-Pearce		P	P	P	P

==== Primary results ====
Republican primary results
Party	Candidate	Votes	%
Republican	Burgess Owens	49,456	43.5
Republican	Kim Coleman	27,575	24.3
Republican	Jay McFarland	24,456	21.5
Republican	Trent Christensen	12,165	10.7
Total votes		113,652	100.0

=== United Utah Party ===
==== Candidates ====
===== Declared =====
- Jonia Broderick, author

=== General election ===
==== Debate ====
2020 Utah's 4th congressional district debate
No.	Date	Host	Moderator	Link	Democratic	Republican
Key: P Participant A Absent N Not invited I Invited W Withdrawn						
Key: P Participant A Absent N Not invited I Invited W Withdrawn					Ben McAdams	Burgess Owens
1	Oct. 12, 2020	Utah Debate Commission	Doug Wilks		P	P

==== Endorsements ====
Ben McAdams (D)

Individuals

- Evan McMullin, political activist, former CIA operations officer, and 2016 presidential candidate

Unions

- Utah AFL–CIO

Organizations

- End Citizens United
- Human Rights Campaign
- League of Conservation Voters Action Fund
- National Committee to Preserve Social Security and Medicare

==== Predictions ====
Source	Ranking	As of
The Cook Political Report	Tossup	August 14, 2020
Inside Elections	Tilt D	June 2, 2020
Sabato's Crystal Ball	Lean D	July 2, 2020
Politico	Tossup	April 19, 2020
Daily Kos	Tossup	June 3, 2020
RCP	Tossup	June 9, 2020
Niskanen	Tossup	June 7, 2020

==== Polling ====
Poll source	Date(s) administered	Sample size	Margin of error	Ben McAdams (D)	Burgess Owens (R)	Other	Undecided
RMG Research	October 12–17, 2020	800 (LV)	± 3.5%	45% (Note: Standard VI response)	46%	4% (Note: Molnar (L) with 3%; Broderick (UUP) with 1%)	5%
RMG Research	October 12–17, 2020	800 (LV)	± 3.5%	47% (Note: Results generated with high Democratic turnout model)	45%	–	–
RMG Research	October 12–17, 2020	800 (LV)	± 3.5%	43% (Note: Results generated with high Republican turnout model)	48%	–	–
RMG Research	September 7–12, 2020	800 (LV)	± 3.5%	45%	41%	3% (Note: Molnar (L) with 2%; Broderick (UUP) with 1%)	11%
Lighthouse Research	August 31 – September 12, 2020	500 (RV)	± 4.38%	47%	37%	2% (Note: Molnar (L) with 2%; Broderick (UUP) and "Other" with 0%)	14%
RMG Research	July 27 – August 1, 2020	800 (RV)	± 3.5%	35%	35%	6% (Note: John Molnar (L) with 4%; Jonia Broderick (United Utah Party) with 2%)	24%
Moore Information (R) (Note: This poll's sponsor is a PAC which supports exclusively Republican Congressional candidates)	July 8–11, 2020	400 (LV)	± 5.0%	34%	43%	5% (Note: John Molnar (L) with 5%; Jonia Broderick (United Utah Party) with <0.5%)	11%

Hypothetical polling

With Jay McFarland

Poll source	Date(s) administered	Sample size	Margin of error	Ben McAdams (D)	Jay McFarland (R)	Undecided
Remington Research Group (R)	October 5–6, 2019	819 (LV)	± 3.4%	45%	40%	15%

with Generic Republican

Poll source	Date(s) administered	Sample size	Margin of error	Ben McAdams (D)	Generic Republican	Other	Undecided
Hinckley Institute	April 19–24, 2020	1000 (RV)	± 3.1%	36%	34%	9% (Note: "Someone else" with 9%)	22%

with Generic Democrat and Generic Republican

Poll source	Date(s) administered	Sample size	Margin of error	Generic Democrat	Generic Republican	Other	Undecided
Y2 Analytics	March 21–30, 2020	307 (LV)	–	38%	38%	5%	18%
Y2 Analytics	January 16–30, 2020	591 (LV)	± (4% – 4.2%)	32%	41%	12% (Note: "Someone else" with 7%; "other" with 5%)	15%
Y2 Analytics	September 25 – October 8, 2019	198 (LV)	–	35%	37%	11% (Note: "Third party candidate" with 8%; "other" with 3%)	17%
Y2 Analytics	June 27 – July 17, 2019	647 (LV)	–	36%	34%	9% (Note: "Third party candidate" with 6%; "other" with 3%)	21%

==== Results ====
Utah's 4th congressional district, 2020
Party	Candidate	Votes	%
Republican	Burgess Owens	179,688	47.7
Democratic	Ben McAdams (incumbent)	175,923	46.7
Libertarian	John Molnar	13,053	3.5
United Utah	Jonia Broderick	8,037	2.1
Write-in		29	0.0
Total votes		376,730	100.0
Republican gain from Democratic			

== Notes ==
Partisan clients
