= Kera Birkeland =

American politician

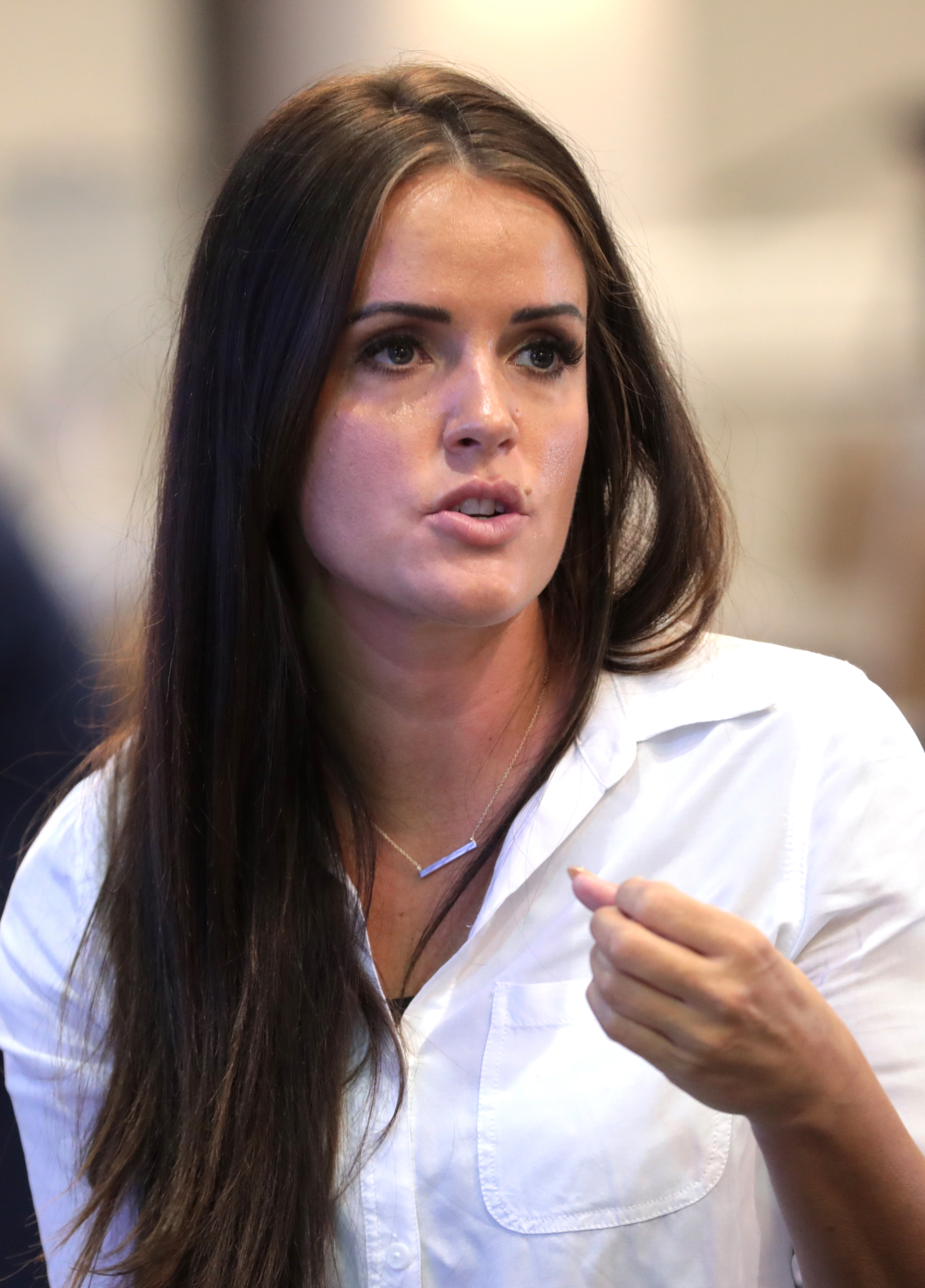
- Birkeland at the 2022 Hazlitt Summit hosted by Young Americans for Liberty Foundation

Member of the Utah House of Representatives
- In office April 16, 2020 – January 10, 2025
- Preceded by: Logan Wilde
- Succeeded by: Tiara Auxier
- Constituency: 53rd district (2020–2023); 4th district (2023–2025)

Personal details
- Born: Kera V. Yates; 1982 or 1983 (age 43–44)
- Party: Republican
- Spouse: Lars Birkeland
- Children: 5

Kera Birkeland is an American Republican politician, educator, and coach from Utah. She served as the representative for Utah House District 4. In the chamber she was on the Executive Offices and Criminal Justice Appropriations Subcommittee, House Education Committee, and House Judiciary Committee. Birkeland replaced Logan Wilde in April 2020, and was elected to a full term in 2020, with 64 percent of the vote.

Citing the need to spend more time with her family, and particularly her parents, Birkeland announced on December 26, 2024, that she will resign from office on January 10, 2025.

== Life ==
Birkeland was home taught between 1983-2000. She is an accomplished pianist and performed “Colors of the Wind” at the Miss Montana Beauty Pageant in 2001.

Birkeland later attended Brigham Young University (BYU) in Provo, Utah. In a 2017 blog post on her personal business website she wrote that she “graduated from BYU.” In 2020 interview with Utah Policy, Birkeland said she “attended BYU the summer of 2001 and 2002.” Birkeland’s personal LinkedIn page reflects the 2001-2002 dates. The State of Utah lists her education as “BYU.”

Prior to election, she competed in the 2012 Mrs. Utah pageant and served as a delegate at the Republican National Convention in the 2016 Republican Party presidential primaries, representing Ted Cruz.

She expressed distaste toward Donald Trump at the time. Birkeland reported being threatened in the bathroom by other female Trump supporters who allegedly told her "you should die" after disagreements regarding floor proceedings.

In January 2021, Birkeland introduced a resolution to honor Utah Jazz player Donovan Mitchell over retired player Shaquille O'Neal, as well as to make 'Spida' (Mitchell's nickname) the state arachnid of Utah. The resolution passed.

== Bill to ban female transgender athletes from high school sports ==
During the 2021 legislative session, Birkeland led efforts and introduced a bill to ban female transgender athletes from high school sports in Utah. This was vetoed by Republican Utah Governor Spencer Cox but passed with a supermajority in the legislature in a subsequent vote after proponents flipped ten votes in the state house and five in the senate. The law currently faces ongoing litigation led by the ACLU of Utah.

In August, a state judge issued an injunction stopping enforcement of the ban, but left the rest of the bill in effect, meaning that transgender girls can seek permission from the commission to play on girls high school sports teams.

The names of the minor age athletes and the resulting rulings brought by parents to the board, are confidential under Utah government records law. On February 7, 2024, Birkeland revealed that four student athletes had petitioned the Utah sports commission and all four had been denied in closed session.
