= Jess Birtcher =

American politician

Member-elect of the Utah House of Representatives from the 44th district
- Assuming office January 1, 2027
- Succeeding: Jordan Teuscher

Personal details
- Party: Democratic
- Website: Campaign website

Jess Birtcher is an American politician. A member of the Democratic Party, he is the member-elect for the 44th district of the Utah House of Representatives. He was elected at the 2026 election.
