= Burgess Owens =

American politician & football player (born 1951)

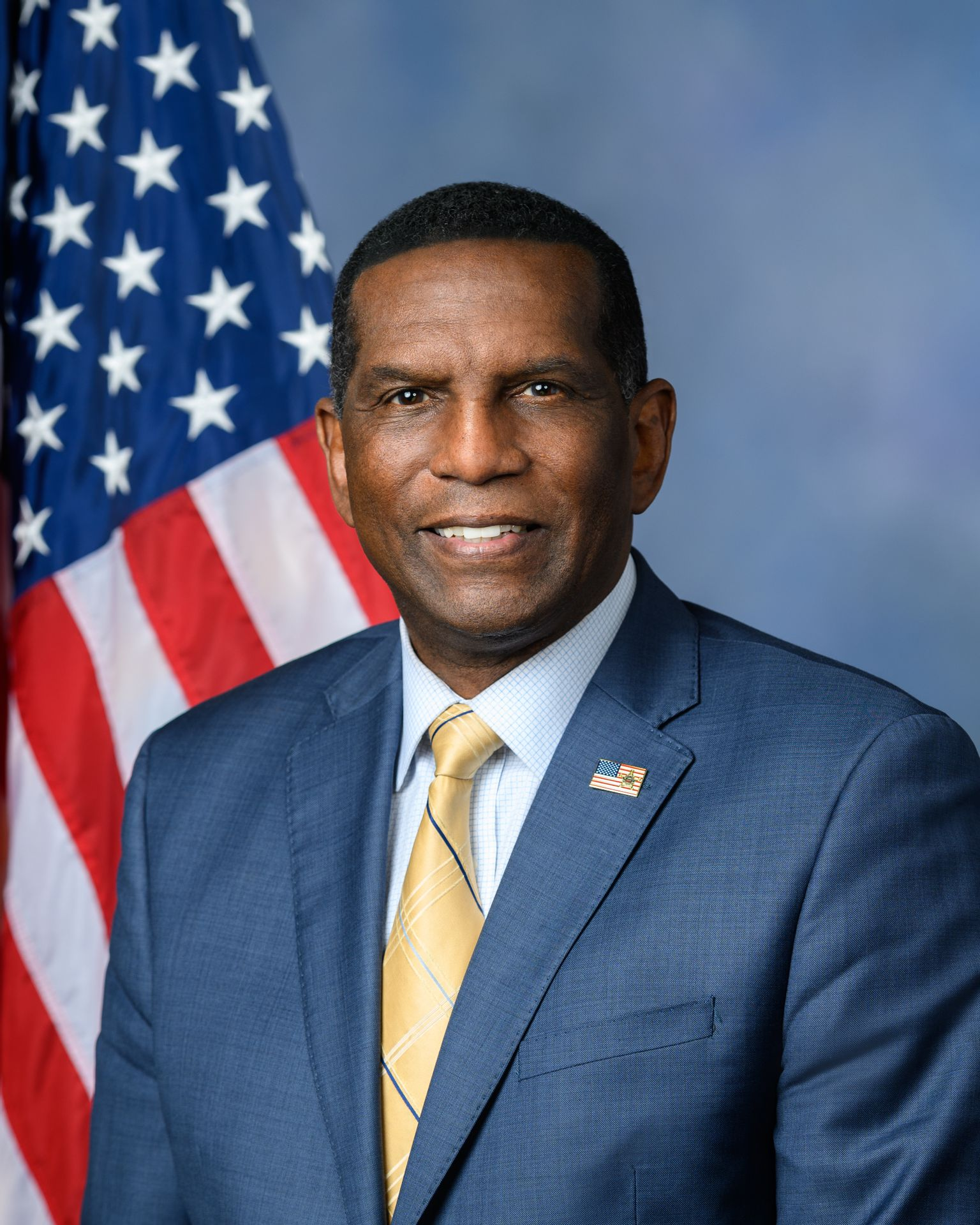
- Official portrait, 2020

Member of the U.S. House of Representatives from Utah's 4th district
- Incumbent
- Assumed office January 3, 2021
- Preceded by: Ben McAdams

Personal details
- Born: Clarence Burgess Owens; August 2, 1951 (age 75) Columbus, Ohio, U.S.
- Party: Republican
- Spouse: Josephine Hart (m. 1978; div. 2012)
- Children: 6
- Education: University of Miami (BS)
- Website: House website Campaign website
- Football career
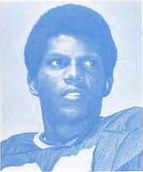
- Owens with the Miami Hurricanes in 1972

No. 22, 44
- Position: Safety

Personal information
- Listed height: 6 ft 2 in (1.88 m)
- Listed weight: 200 lb (91 kg)

Career information
- High school: Rickards (Tallahassee, Florida)
- College: Miami (FL)
- NFL draft: 1973: 1st round, 13th overall pick

Career history
- New York Jets (1973–1979); Oakland / Los Angeles Raiders (1980–1982)

Awards and highlights
- Super Bowl champion (XV); Second-team All-American (1972)

Career NFL statistics
- Interceptions: 30
- Int. return yards: 458
- Defensive Touchdowns: 4
- Stats at Pro Football Reference

Clarence Burgess Owens Jr. (born August 2, 1951) is an American politician and former professional football player. Since 2021, he has served as the U.S. representative for Utah's 4th congressional district.

He played safety for ten seasons in the National Football League (NFL) for the New York Jets and the Oakland / Los Angeles Raiders, winning a championship with the Raiders in Super Bowl XV in 1980. Since leaving the NFL, Owens has founded several businesses and is the CEO of a nonprofit dedicated to helping troubled and incarcerated youth. A member of the Republican Party, Owens was first elected to Congress in 2020, when he narrowly defeated incumbent Democrat Ben McAdams. Owens is one of five Black Republicans in the House of Representatives.

On March 4, 2026, Owens announced he would not seek re-election in 2026.

== Early life and education ==
Clarence Burgess Owens was born in Columbus, Ohio on August 2, 1951. His father, a native of Texas, moved to Columbus to do graduate studies that he could not complete in Texas due to Jim Crow laws. The family later moved to Tallahassee, Florida, where Owens's father taught as a college professor. Owens was raised in a Baptist home. Owens graduated from Rickards High School in Tallahassee in 1969. He was one of four African-American players who were integrated onto a football team at a historically white high school. Owens earned a Bachelor of Science degree in Biology/Chemistry from the University of Miami.

== Football career ==
Owens was the third of four black athletes recruited to play at the University of Miami and the third black student to earn a scholarship. With the Hurricanes, He was named a First-team All-American defensive back, Most Valuable Defensive Player of the North–South All-Star Game, and MVP of the Coaches All-American Game. He was inducted into the University of Miami Sports Hall of Fame in 1980 and its Orange Bowl "Ring of Honor" in 1999.

The New York Jets selected Owens with the 13th pick in the first round of the 1973 NFL draft. During his rookie season, he returned a kickoff 82 yards for a touchdown against the Denver Broncos. This was the Jets' only touchdown scored on a kickoff return during the 1970s. He was a regular starter for the Jets for most of the 1970s and was a part of the Raiders' 1980 Super Bowl XV championship team.

== Post-football career ==
In 1983, Owens moved to New York City. Shortly after leaving professional football, he and his brother ran a business that sold electronics to other businesses to track business expenses. The venture failed, and Owens eventually declared bankruptcy.

Owens later relocated to a small apartment in Brooklyn, where he worked as a chimney sweep and security guard. He later moved to Philadelphia, where he took a sales job with WordPerfect. In later years, he was an account executive with Sprint and Motorola, and from 2009 to 2013, he owned a business called Pure and Simple Solutions.

He is a founder, board member, and CEO of Second Chance 4 Youth, a nonprofit dedicated to helping troubled and incarcerated youth that was founded in 2019.

Owens has been a frequent guest contributor at Fox News.

== U.S. House of Representatives ==
=== Elections ===
==== 2020 ====
In November 2019, Owens announced that he would run for the U.S. House of Representatives in Utah's 4th congressional district. He was one of four candidates in the Republican primary.

On June 30, Owens won the primary with 43% of the vote, defeating Utah State Representative Kim Coleman by 20 points. He also defeated two other challengers: KSL radio personality Jay McFarland and businessman Trent Christensen.

Owens was a speaker at the 2020 Republican National Convention.

Owens faced Democratic incumbent Ben McAdams in the general election. On November 14, eleven days after the election, and with 99% of precincts reporting, President Donald Trump and Utah U.S. Senator Mike Lee congratulated Owens on winning the election, based on Breitbart News calling it for Owens. McAdams conceded to Owens on November 16, and the Associated Press called the race for Owens.

==== 2022 ====
Owens won the Republican primary with 61.9% of the vote against challenger Jake Hunsaker. In the general election, he defeated Democratic nominee Darlene McDonald and United Utah Party nominee January Walker, running with the endorsement of the Forward Party.

==== 2024 ====
Owens ran unopposed in the Republican primary. In the general election, he defeated Democratic nominee Katrina Fallick-Wang and United Utah Party nominee Vaughn Cook.

==== 2026 ====
On March 4, 2026, Owens announced he would not seek re-election. 2026 will be the first contest in which a new congressional district map divided the state into one Democratic-leaning district and three GOP-heavy districts. The new map cut out most of the 4th's share of Salt Lake City, moving it to the new 1st. To make up for this massive population loss, the 4th was pushed to the south and east, absorbing the home of fellow Republican Mike Kennedy. While the new district was more Owens' district than Kennedy's, Owens opted to retire to avoid an incumbent-vs.-incumbent primary.

=== Tenure ===
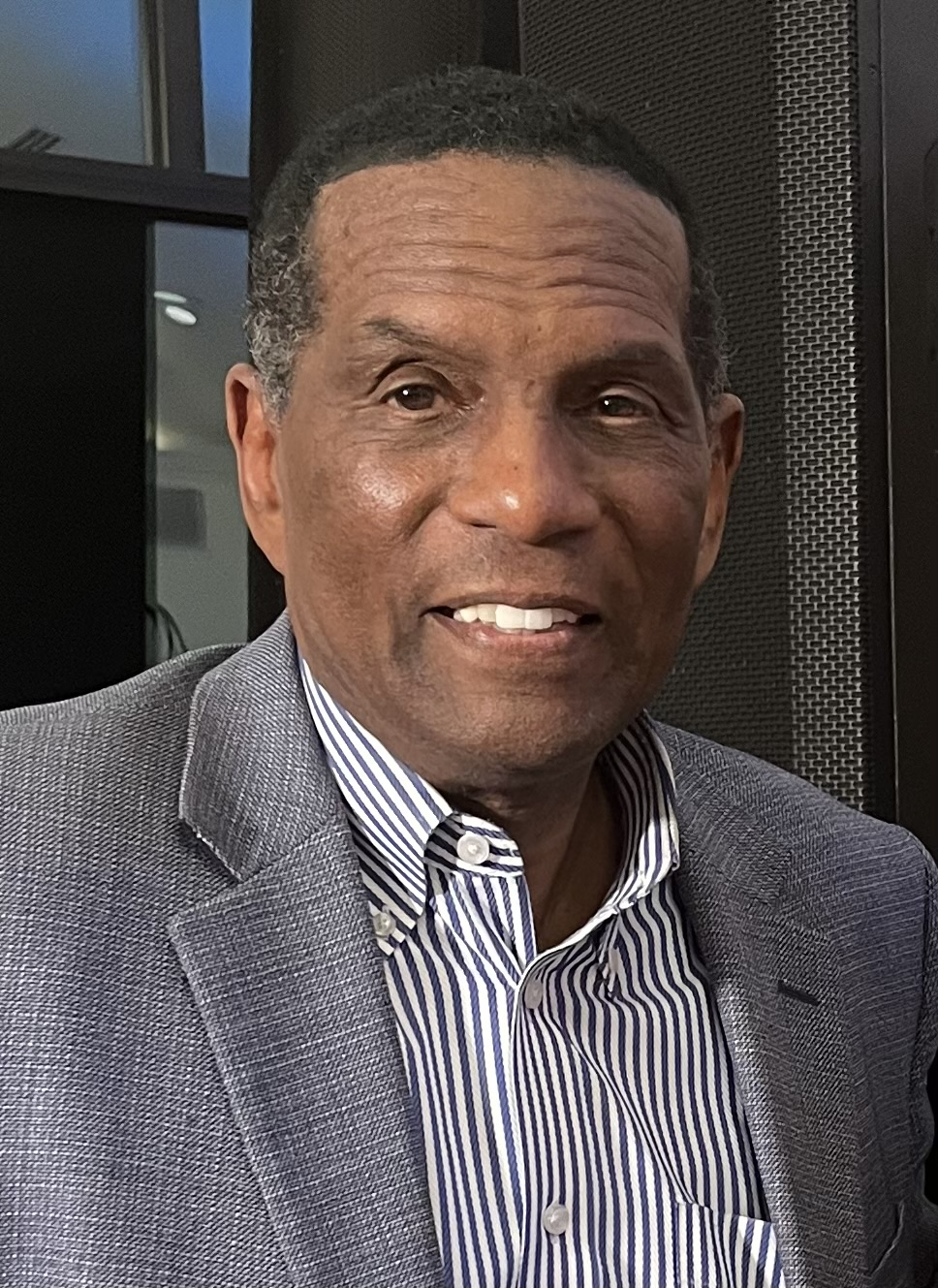
Owens in November 2024

On January 6, 2021, during the certification of electoral votes for the 2020 United States presidential election, Owens opposed the objection to the electors from Arizona but supported the objection to the electors from Pennsylvania.

In 2021, Owens opposed the For the People Act, a Democratic-sponsored bill to reform election laws.

In 2021, Owens co-sponsored the Fairness for All Act, the Republican alternative to the Equality Act. The bill would prohibit discrimination on the basis of sex, sexual orientation and gender identity, and protect the free exercise of religion.

=== Committee assignments ===
- Committee on Education and Workforce (Vice Chair)
  - Subcommittee on Early Childhood, Elementary, and Secondary Education
  - Subcommittee on Higher Education and Workforce Development (Chair)
  - Subcommittee on Health, Employment, Labor, and Pensions
- Committee on Transportation and Infrastructure
  - Subcommittee on Aviation
  - Subcommittee on Highways and Transit
  - Subcommittee on Railroads, Pipelines, and Hazardous Materials

Past assignments

- Committee on the Judiciary

=== Caucus memberships ===
- Republican Study Committee
- Congressional Western Caucus

== Political positions ==
Owens has said that his views were liberal upon leaving the NFL in 1982. However, he had veered sharply to the right over the years, and during his 2020 Republican primary campaign, he described his current views as "very conservative". In June 2019, Owens provided testimony to a United States House Committee on the Judiciary subcommittee opposing a bill that advocated reparations for slavery. He has also criticized U.S. national anthem protests and Colin Kaepernick. In November 2019, Owens called Donald Trump "an advocate for black Americans". On January 6, 2021, he voted to reject Pennsylvania's electoral votes for President-elect Biden but did not vote to reject Arizona's. At a June 1, 2020, Republican primary debate, Owens said that Democrats in Washington are held in thrall by Marxists and socialists. He said, "The days of Ronald Reagan and Tip O'Neill are over. We're dealing with people who hate our country".

=== Healthcare ===
He said early in 2020 that the Affordable Care Act should be repealed and that he supported President Trump. Later on in the campaign, Owens changed his stance regarding the Affordable Care Act, saying that coverage for preexisting conditions should be protected, and that he did not support repeal of Obamacare.

=== Economy ===
In a candidate forum in October 2020, Owens said that the country's top economic need was to reduce business regulations and cut taxes. He also stated his opposition to a minimum-wage increase. When asked about the need for bipartisanship, he responded:

The first thing we have to do is make sure that the Republican Party gets control again... We're at a point now we just cannot afford to go off the cliff and allow a socialist to actually take the lead now... We have to be honest about this. There are truly people who don't love our culture and do anything to destroy it and transform us into something else.

=== LGBT rights ===
On July 19, 2022, Owens was among 47 Republican representatives who voted in favor of the Respect for Marriage Act, which would codify the right to same-sex marriage in federal law. However, Owens voted "present" on final passage on December 8, 2022.

In August 2022, Owens co-sponsored a bill put forth by Marjorie Taylor Greene that would criminalize gender-transition medical treatments for trans youth.

=== Big Tech ===
In 2022, Owens was one of 39 House Republicans to vote for the Merger Filing Fee Modernization Act of 2022, an antitrust package that would crack down on corporations for anti-competitive behavior.

== Personal life ==
On November 24, 1978, Owens was married to Josie Hart and had six children before divorcing in 2012. His eldest child is Summur-Rayn.

He is a prostate cancer survivor.

Owens is a member of the Church of Jesus Christ of Latter-day Saints and has spoken publicly about his faith. He joined the Church during his final season with the Oakland Raiders. Crediting the influence of teammate Todd Christensen, Owens (raised Baptist) and his wife Josie (raised Catholic, with Hindu influence) were baptized on December 31, 1982. In 1988, he spoke at a meeting sponsored by the Charles Redd Center for Western Studies held on the 10th anniversary of the 1978 Revelation on Priesthood.

== Works and publications ==
- It's All About Team: Exposing the Black Talented Tenth, Paperless Publishing LLC, 2012.
- Liberalism or How to Turn Good Men into Whiners, Weenies and Wimps, Post Hill Press, 2016.
- Why I Stand: From Freedom to the Killing Fields of Socialism, Post Hill Press, 2018.

== See also ==
- Black conservatism in the United States
- List of African-American United States representatives
- List of American sportsperson-politicians

U.S. House of Representatives
Preceded by Ben McAdams	Member of the U.S. House of Representatives from Utah's 4th congressional district 2021–present	Incumbent
U.S. order of precedence (ceremonial)
Preceded by Jay Obernolte	United States representatives by seniority 271st	Succeeded by August Pfluger
