= Peggy Wallace =

American politician (1947–2020)

Member of the Utah House of Representatives from the 42nd district
- In office 2001–2007
- Succeeded by: Jim Bird

Personal details
- Born: Margaret Ann Wallace; January 18, 1947 Salt Lake City, Utah
- Died: May 31, 2020 (aged 77) Millcreek, Utah
- Party: Republican

Margaret Ann Wallace (January 18, 1947 – May 31, 2020) was an American businesswoman and politician who served as a member of the Utah House of Representatives.

== Background ==
Wallace was born in Salt Lake City, Utah. She went to the University of Utah and Westminster College. Prior to entering politics, she worked in the credit union business. Wallace served in the Utah House of Representatives from 2001 to 2007 as a Republican.
