= Jim Bird =

American politician

Member of the Utah House of Representatives from the 42nd district
- In office 2007–2015
- Preceded by: Peggy Wallace
- Succeeded by: Kim Coleman

Personal details
- Born: Salt Lake City, Utah
- Party: Republican

Jim Bird is an American politician who served as a Republican member of the Utah House of Representatives for District 42 from 2007 to 2015.

== Background ==
Bird was born January 16 in Salt Lake City, Utah. He works in the financial and insurance industry. Bird lives in West Jordan, Utah with his wife Tamra and three children. During the 2014 General Session Bird served on the House Business and Labor Committee as well as the House Economic Development and Workforce Services Committee.

=== Elections ===
- 2012 Bird was challenged but selected by the Republican convention for the November 6, 2012 General election with 10,600 votes.
- 2006 Bird challenged District 42 incumbent Republican Representative Peggy Wallace in the 2006 Republican Primary, winning by 25 votes with 1,004 votes (50.6%) and won the November 7, 2006 General election with 4,458 votes (58.7%) against Democratic nominee Norman Springer.
- 2008 Bird had three challengers including former Representative Wallace; the Republican convention selected Bird for the November 4, 2008 General election, which Bird won with 9,686 votes (66.1%) against Democratic nominee Nathan Gedge.
- 2010 Bird was challenged but selected by the Republican convention and was unopposed for the November 2, 2010 General election, winning with 8,035 votes.
