= Jordan Teuscher =

American attorney and politician

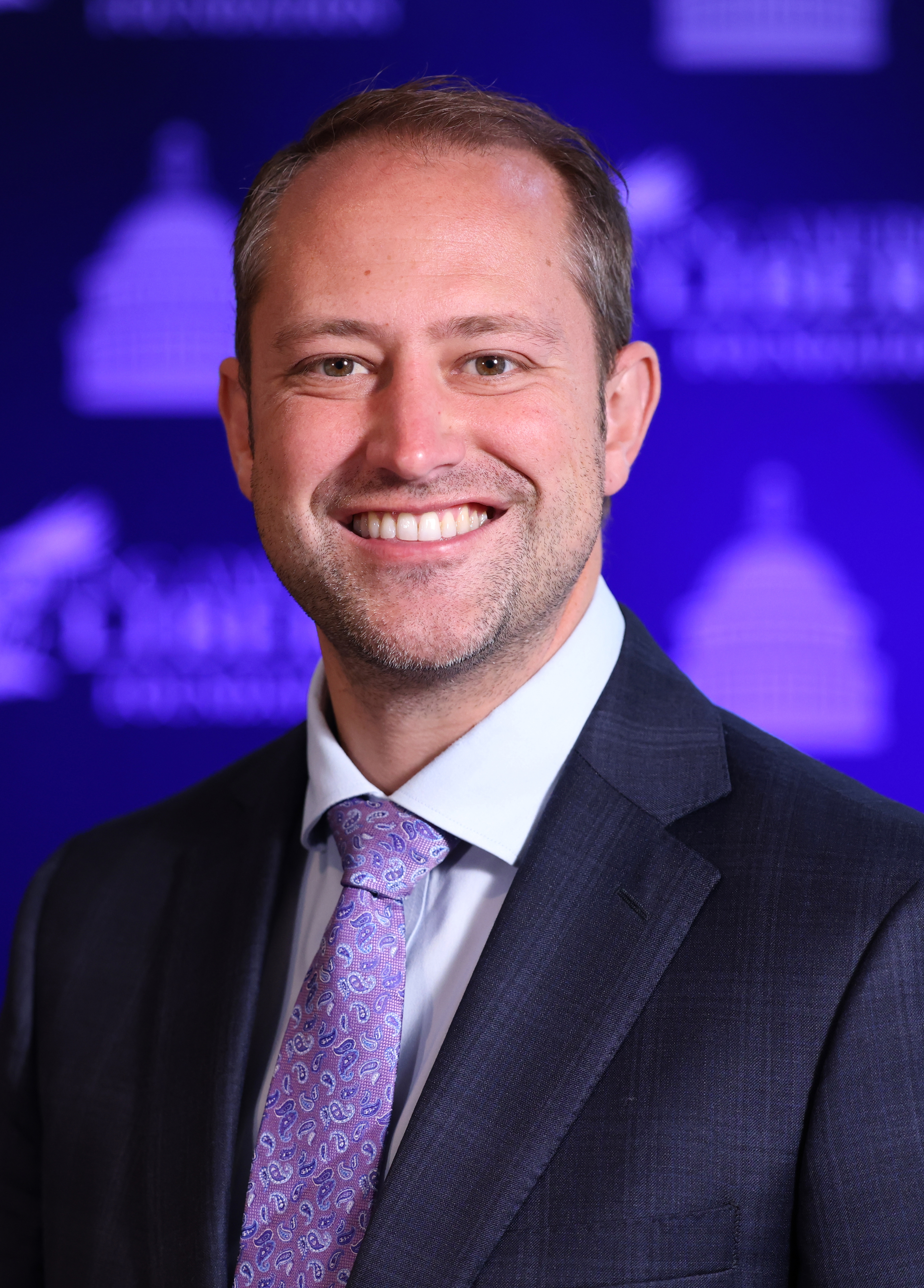
- Teuscher at the 2024 Hazlitt Summit hosted by Young Americans for Liberty Foundation

Member of the Utah House of Representatives
- Incumbent
- Assumed office January 1, 2021
- Preceded by: Kim Coleman
- Succeeded by: Jess Birtcher (elect)
- Constituency: 42nd district (2021–2023); 44th district (2023–present)

Personal details
- Born: Salt Lake City, Utah, U.S.
- Party: Republican
- Education: Brigham Young University (BA, JD)
- Website: jordanteuscher.com

Jordan Daniel Teuscher is an American attorney and politician serving as a member of the Utah House of Representatives from the 44th district. Elected in November 2020, he assumed office on January 1, 2021.

== Early life and education ==
Teuscher was born in Salt Lake City and graduated from Riverton High School. He earned a Bachelor of Arts degree in political science and philosophy from Brigham Young University and a Juris Doctor from the J. Reuben Clark Law School.

== Personal life ==
Outside of his political career, Teuscher is married to Aliona Tymochko and has three children: Tristan, Tanner, and Madeleine who are known for their active involvement in extracurricular activities. Tristan is a musician and soccer player, while Tanner competes in tennis and Madeleine plays soccer. He has occasionally referenced his family in public remarks when discussing his personal values and approach to public policy.

Teuscher often finds himself in teaching moments. In a 2020 video titled “One-minute Salt Lake Republican Convention Speech (House District 42)”, Teuscher recounted a conversation with one of his children during the COVID-19 pandemic. According to Teuscher, his child suggested raising taxes to provide additional funding for scientists in order to find a cure for COVID-19. Teuscher described the suggestion as an example of altruistic thinking, stating, “As I processed his altruistic and innocent idea, I knew that I had a teaching moment on my hands.”

Teuscher went on to explain that he used the conversation to share his perspective as a legislator, describing how he helped his son understand his views on economic policy and governance. He stated that the discussion focused on what he referred to as “the awesomeness of the free market system,” which he said aligned with his broader beliefs regarding taxation, government involvement, and market-based solutions to societal challenges.

== Career ==
Since graduating from law school, Teuscher has worked as an attorney. He completed an externship with the Area Legal Counsel of the Church of Jesus Christ of Latter-day Saints in Kyiv, Ukraine. He was also the chief operating officer of the Leavitt Institute for International Development and worked for the International Center for Law and Religion Studies. Teuscher currently works for the Church of Jesus Christ of Latter-day Saints.

Teuscher was elected to the Utah House of Representatives in November 2020 and assumed office on January 1, 2021.

== Political career ==
2023 General Session

Teuscher sponsored the following bills that passed during the 2023 General Session:

- HB12: Department of Commerce Electronic Payment Fees
- HB102: Higher Education Residency Amendments
- HB174: Conviction Reduction Amendments
- HB192: Traffic Violation Amendments
- HB209: Participation in Extracurricular Activities Amendments
- HB311: Social Media Usage Amendments
- HB351: County Recorder Modifications
- HB353: Sales Tax Return Requirements
- HB357: Decentralized Autonomous Organizations Amendments
- HB358: County Auditor Amendments
- HB365: Voter Affiliation Amendments
- HB374: County Sheriff Amendments

Additionally, Teuscher was the House floor sponsor for the following passed Senate bills:

- SB67: Juvenile Commitment Amendments
- SB81: Property Tax Deferral Revisions
- SB152: Social Media Regulation Amendments
- SB160: Blockchain Liability Amendments
- SB220: Juvenile Court Judge Amendments
- SB230: Kickback Prohibition Amendments

2022 General Session

Teuscher sponsored the following bills that passed during the 2023 General Session:

- HB 91: Financial Disclosures Amendments
- HB111: Court-appointed Therapists Amendments
- HB139: Traffic Violation Amendments
- HB183: In-person Learning Amendments
- HB218: Ballot Measure Amendments
- HB318: Dental Provider Malpractice Amendments
- HB329: Weapon Possession Penalty Amendments
- HB335: Blockchain and Digital Innovation Task Force
- HB456: Digital User Asset Payment Amendments
- HCR5: Concurrent Resolution Condemning the Undemocratic Government of Venezuela

Additionally, Teuscher was the House floor sponsor for the following passed Senate bills:

- SB57: County Amendments
- SB182: Digital Asset Amendments
- SB213: Business Name Prohibitions

During the 2022 General Session, Teuscher served on the Business, Economic Development, and Labor Appropriations Subcommittee, the House Business and Labor Committee House Ethics Committee, and the House Political Subdivisions Committee.

In 2022, Representative Teuscher proposed HB 234, which would require transparency and notice requirements for local education agencies and schools regarding curricula, class syllabi, and associated learning materials used for student instruction. This bill would also require schools to make learning materials to be made available and updated online with descriptions of associated learning materials for parent inspection. After receiving pushback from local educators and an online petition opposing the bill with more than 30,000 signatures, Teuscher dropped the bill for the 2022 Legislative Session.

== 2022 Legislation ==
HB0091S02 Financial Disclosures Amendments, HB0111S01 Court-appointed Therapists Amendments, HB0139S02 Traffic Violation Amendments, HB0183 In-person Learning Amendments, HB0218S01 Citizen Petition Amendments, HB0218S04 Ballot Measure Amendments, HB0234S01 Public Educator Curriculum Transparency Requirements, HB0318 Dental Provider Malpractice Amendments, HB0329 Weapon Possession Penalty Amendments, HB0335S02 Blockchain and Digital Innovation Task Force, HB0339 Paid Teacher Preparation Days for Curriculum and Classroom Transparency, HB0342 Contact Lens Purchase Amendments, HB0356S02 Athletic Coaching Standards Amendments, HB0422S01 School District Voter Eligibility Amendments, HB0433 Attorney General Authority Amendments, HB0456 Virtual Currency Payment Amendments, HB0456S03 Digital User Asset Payment Amendments, HB0470 Higher Education Residency Amendments, HB0472 County Council Amendments, HB0487 Education False Claims Amendments, HCR005 Concurrent Resolution Condemning the Undemocratic Government of Venezuela
