= Kim Coleman =

American politician (born 1967)

Member of the Utah House of Representatives from the 42nd district
- In office January 1, 2015 – January 1, 2021
- Preceded by: Jim Bird
- Succeeded by: Jordan Teuscher

Personal details
- Born: Kim Fitzpatrick; July 11, 1967 (age 59) New Orleans, Louisiana, U.S.
- Party: Republican
- Spouse: Joel Coleman
- Children: 5
- Education: University of Utah (BA)

Kim Coleman (born July 11, 1967) is an American politician who served as a member of the Utah House of Representatives from 2015 to 2021, representing the 42nd district. She was a candidate in the 2020 Republican primary for Utah's 4th congressional district, seeking the Republican nomination to challenge Democratic congressman Ben McAdams, but lost to Burgess Owens.

== Early life and education ==
Coleman was born in New Orleans, Louisiana, and was raised in Louisiana and Texas. At the age of 19, she joined the Church of Jesus Christ of Latter-day Saints and soon after served an 18-month mission in Massachusetts. In 1992, she earned a Bachelor of Arts degree from the University of Utah, where she studied psychology, sociology, and criminology.

== Career ==
Coleman's interest in civic engagement began after she spotted a drug house near her residence, leading her to start a neighborhood watch program. She became a planning commissioner in West Valley City. Her husband, Joel, also served two terms as a West Valley City councilman. She has been active in conservative local politics, having co-founded the West Side Matters Republican Club, served as both a county and state Central Committee member for the Utah Republican Party, and run the political consulting firm Coleman Planet.

The Colemans also founded Monticello Academy, a charter school in West Valley City, where she serves as executive director. She created a financing model now commonly used to allow charter schools to acquire buildings independent of development companies.

=== Utah State Legislature ===
Coleman ran for Utah's 42nd state legislative seat in 2014, defeating incumbent Jim Bird in the Republican convention and winning the November 4, 2014, general election against Democratic nominee Nicholas DeLand with 69.5% of the vote.

Coleman has served on the Judiciary, Political Subdivisions, Law Enforcement (Vice Chair), Public Education (Vice Chair), Administrative Rules, Higher Education Appropriations, and Health and Human Services Appropriations Committees. She also serves on the Attorney General's Opioid Task Force, the Utah Sentencing Commission, the Children's Justice Center Advisory Board, and the Revenue and Taxation Interim Committee.

In 2020, Coleman voted against a tax reform bill that the Utah Legislature passed during a special session in December and that Governor Gary Herbert and state lawmakers later repealed after it proved unpopular. She described this as an instance where she sought to "vote along my principles and the values of my community and my constituents."

==== Higher education ====
Coleman is an advocate of reform on college campuses. As a legislator, she advocated for a variety of issues protecting free speech, including the Campus Anti-Harassment Act and Campus Free Expression Act. Her work protecting campus free speech earned her the Legislator of the Month award from the American Legislative Exchange Council, which wrote, "100% of college students deal with free speech issues on campus. Many of these institutions feel the pressure from one side or the other to act for or against certain ideas or speakers. Enshrining and educating on first amendment principles will guarantee a college is protected against those who would promote chaos instead of debate."

Overturning the Obama administration's "zero tolerance" policies regarding sexual assault on campus, Coleman advanced the Student Right to Active Counsel, which requires institutions of higher education to allow accused parties to have legal representation at disciplinary proceedings. She also successfully advocated for a "Know Before You Go" bill, which requires colleges to inform prospective students about the debt they will accrue relative to their post-graduation financial prospects.

==== Gun rights, police reform, and public safety ====
Coleman was the House sponsor of a bill designed to ban police quotas in citations and arrests, which led to the disclosure from many police officers that they were required to issue a certain number of tickets.

Coleman was a leading co-sponsor when the Utah Legislature considered legislation allowing adults ages 18 to 20 to get concealed carry permits. When representative Carol Spackman Moss insisted the bill was "a step too far," Coleman responded that "A step too far is a completed rape. The single most effective way to stop a completed rape is the use of a gun or a knife." She then shared that she was a survivor of an attempted sexual assault when she was a 19-year-old. She continued, "studies have shown … a woman's best option [when an attempted rape becomes unavoidable] is to resist with a gun in her hands." The bill passed and was signed into law.

==== Legislative awards and honors ====
Coleman has received recognition for her legislative track record, including Legislator of the Month 2019 (ALEC-FreedomWorks), Legislator of the Year 2019 (Keep My Voice), Friend of the Taxpayer (Utah Tax Payers Association), Champion of Economic Freedom (Americans for Prosperity), Defender of Liberty (Libertas), Top 10% (Utah GrassRoots), ALEC-FreedomWorks Legislator of the Week 2017, Award for Conservative Achievement/Excellence (American Conservative Union), and Golden Apple of School Choice Legislator of the Year.

=== 2020 House of Representatives race ===
In January 2020, Coleman announced her candidacy for the U.S. House of Representatives, vying for Utah's 4th congressional district, challenging Democratic incumbent Ben McAdams. Coleman won the Utah state Republican convention in April 2020 with 55% of the delegate vote. Coleman went on to compete in a four-way primary with second-place finisher Burgess Owens, Jay McFarland, and Trent Christensen. On June 30, 2020, Coleman lost to Owens, earning 24% of the vote. Owens won with 43% of the vote.

In a May 2020 editorial for UtahPolicy.com, Coleman wrote that "even when McAdams votes against Pelosi's far-left agenda, he's still voting for it" because the United States' "political system is a two-team sport" and "by his presence, Ben McAdams furthers the radical, far-left agenda of the modern Democrat Party."

==== COVID-19 and the Chinese Communist Party ====
Coleman was an early critic of the Chinese Communist Party's (CCP) mishandling of the novel COVID-19 virus. On her blog, she wrote, "the coronavirus plague facing us comes exclusively as a courtesy of the Chinese Communist Party (CCP). No Communist China, no crisis. The CCP lied and dissembled the reality of this often-deadly virus, their deception costing the rest of the world as many as six weeks of preparation. Those six weeks will end up costing how many thousands of lives worldwide? How many trillions of dollars?"

The Salt Lake Tribune reported on criticism of her blog post, with some commentators calling it "racist." The Tribune later ran an op-ed by Asian-American supporter Frances Floresca defending Coleman's post, stating that "the main purpose of Coleman's post was to explain our nation's dependence on Chinese pharmaceuticals and how China controls the world's medical drug supply. … Coleman is clearly not wanting to harm anyone no matter who they are."

A few weeks later, Coleman affirmed her position and posted to her blog an Atlantic article, "Consider the Possibility that Trump is Right on China."

==== Endorsements ====
In her Republican primary campaign for Utah's 4th Congressional District, Coleman received endorsements from Paul Gosar, Stephen Moore, Andy Biggs, and Jim Jordan. She has also received the support of several Utah-based legislators, mayors, and city councilors, including the county commissioners of 15 of Utah's counties.

Mia Love, who held the seat from 2015 to 2019, also endorsed Coleman.

Coleman was supported by the House Freedom Fund, Foundation for Individual Rights in Education, the Libertas Institute, Americans for Prosperity, NRCC Young Guns, Freedomworks, Right Women PAC, American Conservative Union, the Susan B. Anthony Pro-Life America, Republicans for National Renewal, and Pro-Life Utah.

Coleman had an endorsement and A-rating from the NRA Political Victory Fund.

== Personal life ==
She lives in West Jordan, Utah, with her husband, Joel, and their five children.
