= Bob Stevenson (politician) =

American politician

Member-elect of the Utah House of Representatives from the 16th district
- Assuming office January 1, 2027
- Succeeding: Trevor Lee

Personal details
- Party: Republican

Bob Stevenson is an American politician and member-elect to the Utah House of Representatives, district 16 (Layton/South Weber). A member of the Republican Party, he previously ran in the 2020 Republican Primary for Utah's 1st district in the United States House of Representatives, losing by a small margin to Blake Moore.

Prior to running for state office, he served on the Davis County Commission and as mayor of Layton. In 2026, Stevenson defeated incumbent Trevor Lee in the Republican primary for House District 16. Lee faced fraud allegations that would later result in his resignation.
