= Stephen Handy =

American politician (born 1951)

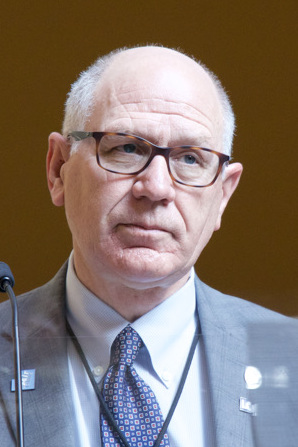
- Handy in 2021

Member of the Utah House of Representatives from the 16th district
- In office April 15, 2010 – December 31, 2022
- Preceded by: Kevin Garn
- Succeeded by: Trevor Lee

Personal details
- Born: March 4, 1951 (age 75) Ogden, Utah, U.S.
- Party: Republican
- Education: University of Utah (BA, MS)
- Website: stevehandyutah.com

Stephen G. Handy (born March 4, 1951) is an American politician who served as a member of the Utah House of Representatives for the 16th district. He assumed office on April 15, 2010.

== Early life and education ==
Handy was born on March 4, 1951, in Ogden, Utah. He earned a Bachelor of Arts degree in English and a Master of Science in human resource management from the University of Utah.

== Professional and political career ==
When not at the legislature, Handy works at his public relations and marketing consulting firm, Stephen J. Handy Marketing Communications Inc.

Before serving in the state legislature, Stephen Handy served eight years on the Layton City Council. He also ran to become Layton's Mayor, but was unsuccessful. On April 15, 2010, Handy was appointed by Governor Gary Herbert to fill the vacancy created by the resignation of then-Representative and House Majority Leader Kevin Garn. During the 2016 legislative session, Handy served on the Natural Resources, Agriculture, and Environmental Quality Appropriations Subcommittee, the House Natural Resources, Agriculture, and Environment Committee, and the House Public Utilities and Technology Committee. During the 2022 legislative session, Handy served on the Natural Resources, Agriculture, and Environment Appropriations Subcommittee, the House Natural Resources, Agriculture, and Environment Committee, and the House Economic Development and Workforce Services Committee.

== Political positions ==
=== Environment and energy policy ===
Rep. Handy is an advocate of policies intended to limit pollution. He currently serves as the co-chair of the Utah Legislature's Clean Air Caucus. In 2022, Rep. Handy sponsored HB 109, which would allow medical professionals to list air pollution as a contributing cause of someone's death.

Handy said that "the abundance of inexpensive fossil fuels has powered America to its industrial greatness, the strongest economy the world has ever known." However, he is also concerned with what he sees as the increase in pollution from fossil fuels. He does not consider himself as an "environmentalist", and he opposes government mandates, but he says he supports solutions to help curb pollution through market-driven methods. Rep. Handy supports the expansion of renewable energy sources. In 2019 he sponsored HB411, which he considers as one of the most consequential bills in his career, that "provides cities with mechanisms to establish and achieve a community goal to source net-100% of electric energy from renewable resources by 2030".

Handy praised Senator Mitt Romney for being "a standard-bearer on climate in the GOP".

=== Education ===
Handy describes himself as pro-school choice. He supports having charter schools and homeschooling as well as public schools. He believes that local school boards should make the decisions on how education money from the state is spent instead of the state legislature. He also said that school curricula decisions "should be guided by school administrators with strong parental input".

=== License plate revisions ===
In 2021, Handy proposed HB 198, which would have added an additional license plate commemorating Dark Skies. The bill failed to pass the House due to concerns from the body on the bill's impact on the budget, and other issues. In 2022, an amended version of the bill, which included adding the Dark Skies plate as a specialty license plate as opposed to a general license plate, passed the Legislature.

=== Gun policy ===
In 2019, Handy sponsored HB 209, the Extreme Risk Protection Order, which would allow a person's guns and ammunition to be temporarily confiscated by court order if relatives of the person and police officers have cause to believe the person is a threat to himself and others. It has been characterized as a "red flag law".

== Elections ==
- 2014 Handy challenged Democratic Party nominee Douglas Sill and Constitution Party nominee Jeffrey Ostler in the 2014 general election. Handy won with 4,366 votes (66.55%).
- 2012 One of Handy's 2010 challengers returned for the June 26, 2012 Republican primary; Handy won with 1,988 votes (65.3%) and won the three-way November 6, 2012 general election with 8,252 votes (66.8%) against Democratic nominee Douglas Sill and Libertarian candidate Kevin Bryan.
- 2010 Handy had three challengers and was nominated at the Republican convention. Handy was unopposed for the November 2, 2010 general election, winning with 6,629 votes.
