= Trevor Lee (politician) =

American politician

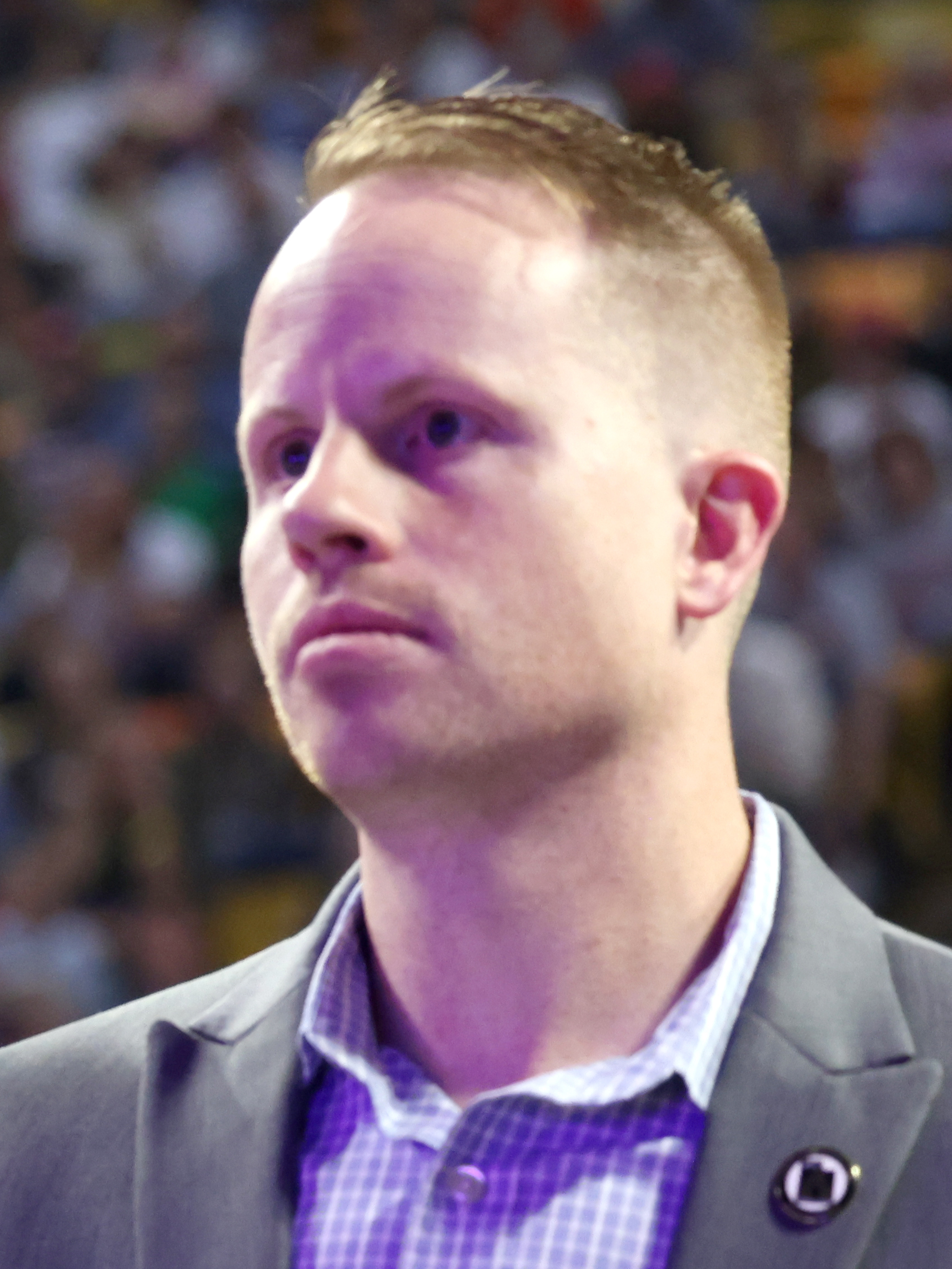
- Lee in 2025

Member of the Utah House of Representatives from the 16th district
- In office January 1, 2023 – September 28, 2026
- Preceded by: Stephen Handy
- Succeeded by: Vacant

Personal details
- Party: Republican
- Education: Weber State University

Trevor Lee (born September 1991) is an American politician who served as a Republican member of the Utah House of Representatives from the 16th district. He assumed office on January 1, 2023, and was re-elected in 2024, and resigned from office on September 28, 2026 after being charged with fraud. He is known for his legislation attacking the LGBTQ community and his association with the alt-right "DezNat" movement.

== Early life and education ==
Lee graduated from Davis High School and has a degree from Weber State University.

== Political career ==
Lee was first elected to the Utah House of Representatives in 2022 and began his service on January 1, 2023.. He lost the 2026 Republican primary to challenger Bob Stevenson and will leave the legislature in 2027.

=== Controversial legislation ===
==== 2025 ====
Lee was a sponsor of HB77, a bill that Lee said "would ban Pride flags from schools" and local government buildings, while allowing Nazi and Confederate flags to be displayed in Utah classrooms for educational purposes. The bill became law without Gov. Spencer Cox's signature and went into effect May 7, 2025. The law places responsibility for enforcement upon the state auditor.

Lee was a co-sponsor on the 2025 HB81 bill that banned fluoride in public water systems. This law made Utah the first state to ban fluoride in drinking water. The bill was opposed by the American Dental Association. Opponents of the bill noted that research has found that water fluoridation prevents about 25% of tooth decay, and warned that the bill may disproportionately affect low-income residents.

==== 2026 ====
Lee was the floor sponsor for SB153, "Election Amendments," which was signed into law on March 18, 2026. The bill made about 300,000 Utah voter registration records previously classified as private without a listed reason to be reclassified as public except for voters who met certain, strict "at-risk" qualifications.

Lee was the primary sponsor of 15 other bills in the 2026 session, many of which targeted undocumented immigrants. This included bills that would have repealed the state's "driving privilege card" program for those who couldn't prove lawful presence (HB287) and required verification of lawful presence prior to receiving certain public health and welfare benefits (HB88). His stated goal was to convince more undocumented immigrants to "self-deport." None of these bills passed.

== Controversies ==
=== Twitter account controversy ===
In 2022, The Salt Lake Tribune reported that Lee was behind a Twitter account that promoted election and coronavirus conspiracy theories and attacked women and LGBTQ individuals. These events occurred after Lee had previously made transphobic comments and used a slur for transgender people on a Utah podcast, for which he had apologized and "erased it from [his] vocabulary."

=== Pride Month controversy ===
In June 2025, during Pride Month, the Utah Mammoth NHL hockey team posted a message on X that said "Happy Pride!" with the team logo rendered in the colors of the Pride Flag. Lee replied to the tweet, claiming "Utahns overwhelmingly don't support pride month." He then said to "watch for some significant legislation this next session that pushes back onto these woke groups!" When KSL-TV requested an interview with Lee, he declined and would not discuss the legislation, saying "you'll have to wait and see" and that the Utah Legislature "will be putting a stop to entities that will take taxpayer money from pushing political agendas." In a later tweet, he claimed "'Pride' is about promoting the social acceptance of gay sex, transgender child mutilation and various other forms of iniquity. Its premise is that they are not just not sinful, but worthy of celebration."

A 2024 survey by the Public Religion Research Institute found that 86% of Utahns expressed support for LGBTQ nondiscrimination protections.

=== Check fraud and abuse of power allegations ===
In April 2026, two business owners who formerly employed Lee spoke out against Lee and his reelection campaign.

- In 2013, while employed as a sales manager in North Carolina for a pest control company owned by Jason Walton, Lee altered multiple checks by increasing the paid amounts, totaling about $3,100. Walton stated that he chose not to press charges after Lee signed an admission of guilt.
- Trent Spafford, the owner of a water treatment company, alleged that in 2024, while Lee was employed there as a sales consultant, he requested paycheck advances totaling $93,000 to help with financing on his home. After Spafford informed Lee that he would no longer be issuing him any advances, Lee allegedly suggested that he use his position as a legislator could get Spafford government contracts providing water treatment services for Hill Air Force Base and Utah public schools.

In response, Lee publicly admitted that Walton's allegations were true, calling it a "grave error" which he "deeply regretted." However, he denied Spafford's allegations.

Mike Schultz, Speaker of the Utah House of Representatives, referred the matter to the Utah Attorney General for further investigation. A few days later, at the Davis County Republican Party nominating convention, a majority (55%) of delegates voted for his opponent, county commissioner Bob Stevenson. However, he still earned enough support to appear in the primary election in June.

On September 28, 2026, Lee was charged with communications fraud, mortgage fraud, and forgery; he resigned from his House seat the same day.

== Personal life ==
Trevor Lee lives in Layton, Utah, with his wife Kaitlin and their four children.

== Sponsored legislation ==
=== 2023 ===
Bill	Status
HB 165- Firearm Discharge on Private Property Amendments	Governor signed 3/20/2023
HB 270- School Cellphone Usage Amendments	House filed 3/3/2023
HB 283- Unemployment Insurance Amendments	House filed 3/3/2023
HB 289- Blockchain Provider Registration	Governor signed 3/13/2023
HCR 7- Concurrent Resolution Supporting the Creation of the Great Salt Lake Sentinel Landscape	Governor Signed 3/14/2023

=== 2024 ===
Bill	Status
HB 118- Prohibition of Production of Private Keys	Governor signed 3/18/2024
HB 121- Educator Background Check Amendments	Governor signed 3/12/2024
HB 123- Vaccine Disclosure Amendments	House filed 3/1/2024
HB 165- Federal Law Enforcement Amendments	Governor signed 3/13/2024
HB 170- Unemployment Insurance Amendments	Governor signed 3/13/2024
HB 455- Education Industry Employee Privacy	House filed 3/1/2024
HB 517- Half-day Kindergarten Amendments	Governor signed 3/18/2024
HB 549- Product Disclosure Requirements	House filed 3/1/2024
HJR 12- Joint Resolution on the Illegal Immigration Crisis	House filed 3/1/2024

=== 2025 ===
Bill	Status
HB 77- Flag Display Amendments	Became law without Governor signature 3/27/2025
HB 84- Vaccine Amendments	Governor signed 3/26/2025
HB 114- Architects Licensing Act Amendments	Governor signed 3/25/2025
HB 124- Education Industry Employee Privacy	Governor signed 3/26/2025
HB 183- Noncitizen Restricted Person Amendments	Governor signed 3/25/2025
HB 270- Voter Registration Records Amendments	House filed 3/7/2025
HB 423- Voting Registration Amendments	House filed 3/7/2025
