= Logan Wilde =

American politician (born 1976)

Member of the Utah House of Representatives from the 53rd district
- In office January 1, 2017 – April 15, 2020
- Preceded by: Melvin R. Brown
- Succeeded by: Kera Birkeland

Personal details
- Born: March 27, 1976 (age 50) Croydon, Utah
- Party: Republican

Logan Wilde (born March 27, 1976) is an American politician who served in the Utah House of Representatives from the 53rd district from 2017 to 2020 when he resigned.
