= Justin Fawson =

American politician

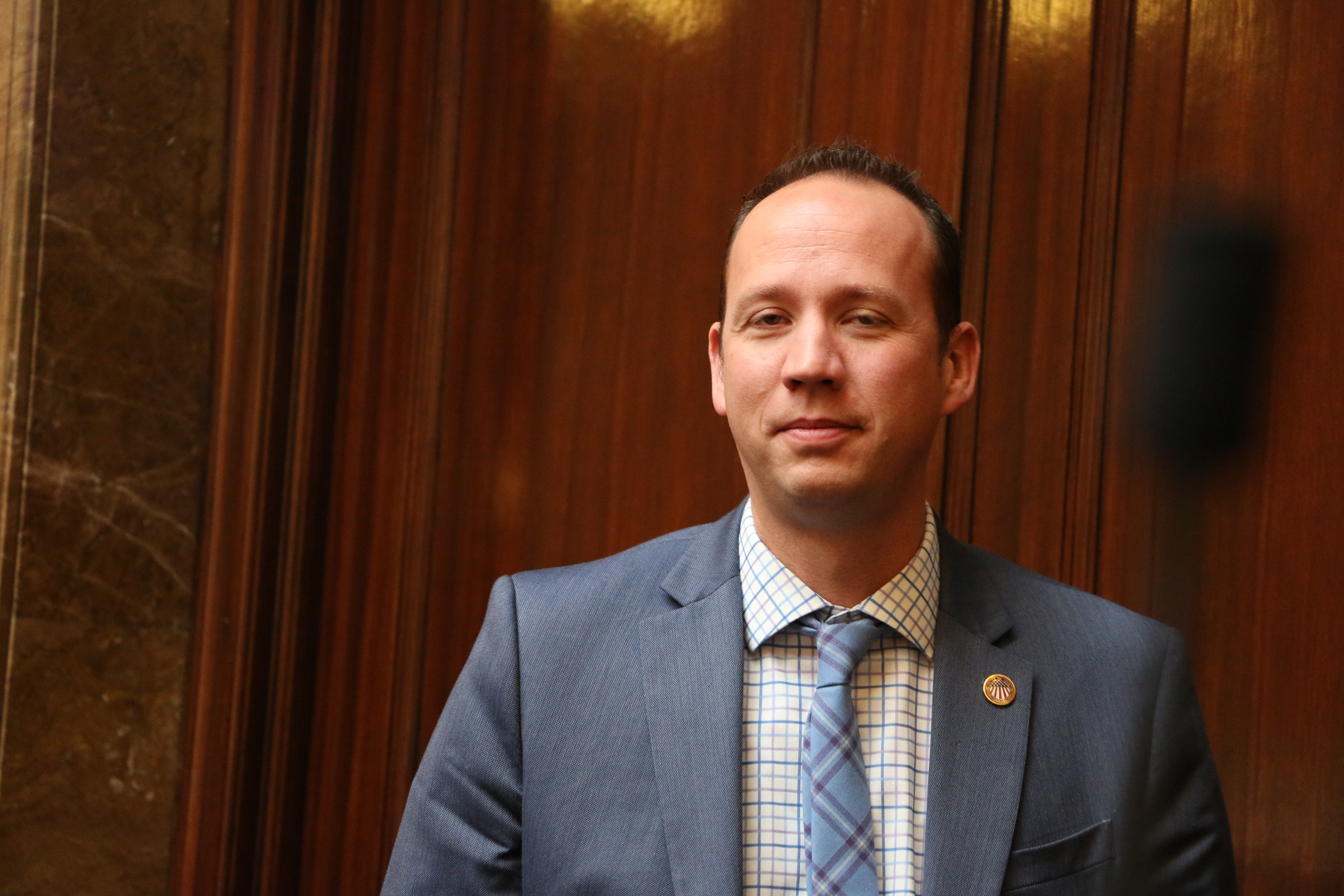

Member of the Utah House of Representatives from the 7th district
- Incumbent
- Assumed office January 1, 2015
- Preceded by: Ryan Wilcox

Personal details
- Born: June 16
- Party: Republican
- Spouse: Sara
- Education: Defense Language Institute; Westminster College; Capella University
- Profession: Director of Marketing, Mountain Alarm
- Website: http://www.justinfawson.com

Justin L. Fawson is an American politician and a Republican member of the Utah House of Representatives representing District 7 since April 23, 2014.

== Early life and career ==
Born June 16, Fawson enlisted in the Utah National Guard after serving a two-year LDS mission to Milan, Italy. He served nine years, attaining the rank of Staff Sergeant before being honorably discharged in 2005. During his time in the National Guard, Fawson studied at the Defense Language Institute earning a Certificate of Linguistics in Arabic. He earned a BA degree in International Business from Westminster College in 2004 and an MBA specializing in Global Operations/Supply Chain Management from Cappella University in 2013. He currently works as Director of Marketing for Mountain Alarm, a security and fire protection provider. He lives in North Ogden, UT with his wife, Sara and four children.

== Political career ==
2014 Fawson was appointed to fill the seat vacated by Ryan Wilcox, who resigned to become the Northern Utah Director. He then ran in the 2014 General Election against Democrat Camille Neider and Libertarian Roger Condie. Fawson won with 4,392 votes (65.01%).

2015 During the 2015 General Session, Fawson served on the Public Education Appropriations Subcommittee, the House Education Committee, the House Transportation Committee, the Transportation Interim Committee, and the Education Interim Committee.

2016 During the 2016 General Session, Fawson served on the Public Education Appropriations Subcommittee, the House Education Committee, and the House Transportation Committee.

2017 During the 2017 General Session, Fawson served on the Public Education Appropriations Subcommittee, the House Education Committee, the House Rules Committee, the House Transportation Committee, the Education Interim Committee, and the Transportation Interim Committee.

2018 During the 2018 General Session, Fawson was selected to be the vice-chair of the House Government Operations Committee. In addition to that, he served on the Public Education Appropriations Subcommittee, the House Education Committee, the House Rules Committee, the Education Interim Committee, and the House Transportation Committee.

== 2015 Sponsored Legislation ==
Bill number	Bill title	Status
HB0209	Suicide Prevention Program Amendments	Governor Signed – 3/23/2015
HB0275	Highway Designation Amendments	Governor Signed – 3/30/2015

Fawson passed both of the two bills he introduced during the 2015 General Session, giving him a 100% passage rate. He also floor sponsored SB0133S04 Podiatric Physician Amendments and SB0149 Repeal of Funds.

== 2016 Sponsored Legislation ==
Bill number	Bill title	Status
HB0198	Ballot Proposition Amendments	Governor Signed – 3/18/2016
HB0298S04	Lawful Commerce in Arms	Governor Signed – 3/22/2016
HB0306	Taxation of Social Security and Retirement Benefits	House/ filed – 3/10/2016
HB0326	Special and Local District Transparency	House/ filed – 3/10/2016
HB0329S01	Federal Funds Procedures Act Amendments	Governor Signed – 3/25/2016
HCR005S01	Concurrent Resolution Recognizing the 100-year Anniversary of Our National Parks	Governor Signed – 3/10/2016

Fawson passed four of the six bills he introduced during the 2016 General Session, giving him a 66.7% passage rate. He also floor sponsored SB0058S04 Nurse Practitioner Amendments.

== 2017 Sponsored Legislation ==
Bill number	Bill title	Status
HB0184	Contraband Device Destruction	Governor Signed – 3/23/2017
HB0194S01	Federal Grants Management Amendments	Governor Signed – 3/22/2017
HB0195S01	Dissolution of Local Districts	Governor Signed – 3/22/2017
HB0250S02	Driving Under the Influence Program Amendments	Governor Signed – 3/28/2017
HB0292	Charter School Admission Amendments	Governor Signed – 3/17/2017
HB0329S02	Conceal Carry Reciprocity Amendments	House/ filed – 3/09/2017
HB0368	Related to Basic School Programs Review	House/ filed – 3/09/2017
HB0369S04	Criminal Penalty Enhancements for Sexual Offenses	Governor Signed – 3/28/2017

Fawson passed six of the eight bills he introduced during the 2017 General Session, giving him a 75% passage rate. He also floor sponsored SB0150S02 Local Government Bond Amendments and SB0186 Education Reporting Amendments.
