= 66th Utah State Legislature =

←	65th	67th	→
- the Seal of Utah

Overview
- Term: January 21, 2025 – March 6, 2026

Senate
- Republican (22); Democratic (6); Forward (1)
- Members: 29 senators
- President: J. Stuart Adams

House of Representatives
- Republican (61); Democratic (14)
- Members: 75 representatives
- Speaker: Mike Schultz

Sessions
- 2025: January 21, 2025 – March 7, 2025
- 2026: January 20, 2026 – March 6, 2026

The 66th session of the Utah State Legislature began on January 21, 2025. All seats of the Utah House saw members elected at the 2024 Utah House of Representatives election, while 15 of 29 Senate seats had elections in the 2024 Utah Senate election.

== Political composition ==
=== Senate ===
	Party (Shading indicates majority caucus)			Total	Vacant
	Republican	Democratic	Forward	Total	Vacant
End of the previous Legislature	23	6	—N/a	29	0
Begin 2025	23	6	—N/a	29	0
March 7, 2025 (Note: Daniel Thatcher changed affiliation from the Republican Party to the Forward Party.)	22	6	1	29	0
Latest voting share	76%	21%	3%		

=== House of Representatives ===
	Party (Shading indicates majority caucus)		Total	Vacant
	Republican	Democratic	Total	Vacant
End of the previous Legislature	61	14	75	0
Begin 2025	61	14	75	0
Latest voting share	81%	19%		

== Leadership ==
=== Senate leadership ===
Position	Name	Party	District
President of the Senate	J. Stuart Adams	Republican	7
Majority Leader	Kirk Cullimore Jr.	Republican	19
Majority Whip	Chris H. Wilson	Republican	2
Assistant Majority Whip	Mike McKell	Republican	25
Minority Leader	Luz Escamilla	Democratic	10
Minority Whip	Karen Kwan	Democratic	12
Assistant Minority Whip	Jen Plumb	Democratic	9

=== House leadership ===
Position	Name	Party	District
Speaker of the House	Mike Schultz	Republican	12
Majority Leader	Jefferson Moss	Republican	51
Majority Whip	Karianne Lisonbee	Republican	14
Majority Assistant Whip	Casey Snider	Republican	5
Minority Leader	Angela Romero	Democratic	25
Minority Whip	Jennifer Dailey-Provost	Democratic	22
Minority Assistant Whip	Sahara Hayes	Democratic	32
Source: Utah Legislature

== Membership ==
=== Senate membership ===
District	Name	Party	Counties represented	Assumed office
1	Scott Sandall	Rep	Box Elder, Cache, Tooele	2019 (Note: Previously served in the Utah House of Representatives.)
2	Chris H. Wilson	Rep	Cache, Rich	2021
3	John D. Johnson	Rep	Morgan, Summit, Weber	2021
4	Cal Musselman	Rep	Davis, Weber	2025
5	Ann Millner	Rep	Davis, Morgan, Weber	2015
6	Jerry Stevenson	Rep	Davis	2010 (Note: Originally appointed to office.)
7	Stuart Adams	Rep	Davis	2010
8	Todd Weiler	Rep	Davis, Salt Lake	2012
9	Jennifer Plumb	Dem	Salt Lake	2023
10	Luz Escamilla	Dem	Salt Lake	2009
11	Daniel Thatcher	FWD	Salt Lake, Tooele, Utah	2011
12	Karen Kwan	Dem	Salt Lake	2023
13	Nate Blouin	Dem	Salt Lake	2023
14	Stephanie Pitcher	Dem	Salt Lake	2023
15	Kathleen Riebe	Dem	Salt Lake	2019
16	Wayne Harper	Rep	Salt Lake	2013
17	Lincoln Fillmore	Rep	Salt Lake	2016
18	Daniel McCay	Rep	Salt Lake, Utah	2019
19	Kirk Cullimore Jr.	Rep	Salt Lake, Utah	2019
20	Ronald Winterton	Rep	Daggett, Duchesne, Summit, Uintah, Wasatch	2019
21	Brady Brammer	Rep	Utah	2025
22	Heidi Balderree	Rep	Salt Lake, Utah	2023
23	Keith Grover	Rep	Utah	2018
24	Keven Stratton	Rep	Utah, Wasatch	2025 (Note: Previously served in the Utah House of Representatives, appointed in 2012)
25	Mike McKell	Rep	Utah	2021
26	David Hinkins	Rep	Carbon, Emery, Garfield, Grand, Kane, San Juan, Utah, Wasatch, Wayne	2009
27	Derrin Owens	Rep	Garfield, Juab, Kane, Millard, Piute, Sanpete, Sevier, Utah, Washington, Wayne	2021
28	Evan Vickers	Rep	Beaver, Iron, Juab, Millard, Washington	2013
29	Don Ipson	Rep	Washington	2016
Source: Utah Legislature

=== House membership ===
District	Name	Party	Counties represented	Assumed office
1	Thomas W. Peterson	Rep	Box Elder, Cache	2022
2	Michael J. Petersen	Rep	Cache	2021
3	Jason E. Thompson	Rep	Cache	2025
4	Tiara Auxier	Rep	Daggett, Duchesne, Morgan, Rich, Summit	2025
5	Casey Snider	Rep	Cache	2018
6	Matthew H. Gwynn	Rep	Box Elder, Weber	2021
7	Ryan D. Wilcox	Rep	Weber	2021 (also 2009–2014)
8	Jason B. Kyle	Rep	Morgan, Weber	2023
9	Jake Sawyer	Rep	Weber	2025
10	Jill Koford	Rep	Weber	2025
11	Katy Hall	Rep	Davis, Weber	2023
12	Mike Schultz	Rep	Davis, Weber	2015
13	Karen M. Peterson	Rep	Davis	2022
14	Karianne Lisonbee	Rep	Davis	2017
15	Ariel Defay	Rep	Davis	2023
16	Trevor Lee	Rep	Davis	2023
17	Stewart E. Barlow	Rep	Davis	2011
18	Paul A. Cutler	Rep	Davis	2023
19	Raymond P. Ward	Rep	Davis	2015
20	Melissa G. Ballard	Rep	Davis	2019
21	Sandra Hollins	Dem	Salt Lake	2015
22	Jennifer Dailey-Provost	Dem	Salt Lake	2019
23	Hoang Nguyen	Dem	Salt Lake, Summit	2025
24	Grant Amjad Miller	Dem	Salt Lake	2025
25	Angela Romero	Dem	Salt Lake	2013
26	Matt MacPherson	Rep	Salt Lake	2023
27	Anthony E. Loubet	Rep	Salt Lake	2023
28	Nicholeen Peck	Rep	Tooele	2025
29	Bridger Bolinder	Rep	Juab, Millard, Tooele	2023
30	Jake Fitisemanu	Dem	Salt Lake	2025
31	Verona Mauga	Dem	Salt Lake	2025
32	Sahara Hayes	Dem	Salt Lake	2023
33	Doug Owens	Dem	Salt Lake	2021
34	Carol S. Moss	Dem	Salt Lake	2001
35	Rosalba Dominguez	Dem	Salt Lake	2025
36	James A. Dunnigan	Rep	Salt Lake	2003
37	Ashlee Matthews	Dem	Salt Lake	2021
38	Cheryl K. Acton	Rep	Salt Lake	2017
39	Ken Ivory	Rep	Salt Lake	2021 (also 2011–2019)
40	Andrew Stoddard	Dem	Salt Lake	2019
41	Gay Lynn Bennion	Dem	Salt Lake	2021
42	Clinton Okerlund	Rep	Salt Lake	2025
43	Steve Eliason	Rep	Salt Lake	2011
44	Jordan D. Teuscher	Rep	Salt Lake	2021
45	Tracy Miller	Rep	Salt Lake	2025
46	Calvin Roberts	Rep	Salt Lake	2025
47	Mark A. Strong	Rep	Salt Lake	2019
48	James F. Cobb	Rep	Salt Lake	2023
49	Candice P. Pierucci	Rep	Salt Lake	2019
50	Stephanie Gricius	Rep	Utah	2023
51	Jefferson Moss	Rep	Utah	2017
52	A. Cory Maloy	Rep	Utah	2017
53	Kay J. Christofferson	Rep	Utah	2013
54	Kristen Chevrier	Rep	Utah	2025
55	Jon Hawkins	Rep	Utah	2019
56	Val L. Peterson	Rep	Utah	2011
57	Nelson T. Abbott	Rep	Utah	2021
58	David Shallenberger	Rep	Utah	2025
59	Mike L. Kohler	Rep	Summit, Wasatch	2021
60	Tyler Clancy	Rep	Utah	2023
61	Lisa Shepherd	Rep	Utah	2025
62	Norman K Thurston	Rep	Utah	2015
63	Stephen L. Whyte	Rep	Utah	2021
64	Jefferson S. Burton	Rep	Utah	2021
65	Douglas R. Welton	Rep	Utah	2021
66	Troy Shelley	Rep	Juab, Sanpete	2025
67	Christine F. Watkins	Rep	Carbon, Duchesne, Emery, Grand	2017
68	Scott H. Chew	Rep	Duchesne, Uintah	2015
69	Logan Monson	Rep	Emery, Garfield, Grand, Kane, San Juan, Wayne	2025
70	Carl R. Albrecht	Rep	Beaver, Iron, Piute, Sevier	2017
71	Rex Shipp	Rep	Iron	2019
72	Joseph Elison	Rep	Washington	2023
73	Colin W. Jack	Rep	Washington	2022
74	R. Neil Walter	Rep	Washington	2023
75	Walt Brooks	Rep	Washington	2016
Source: Utah Legislature

== See also ==
- List of Utah State Legislatures
