= 67th Utah State Legislature =

←	66th	68th	→
- the Seal of Utah

Overview
- Term: January 19, 2027 –

Senate
- Republican (21); Democratic (8)
- Members: 29 senators
- President: Evan Vickers

House of Representatives
- Republican (45); Democratic (28); Independent (2)
- Members: 75 representatives
- Speaker: Mike Schultz

Sessions
- 2027: January 19, 2027 – March 5, 2027

The 66th session of the Utah State Legislature begins on January 19, 2027. All seats of the Utah House saw members elected at the 2026 Utah House of Representatives election, while 14 of 29 Senate seats had elections in the 2026 Utah Senate election. In the 2026 elections, the Democratic Party picked up seats in both the Senate and the House, doubling the size of their House caucus. Two independent candidates were elected to the Utah House in 2026, the first unaffiliated Utah legislators since at least 1934, possibly the first in Utah history.

== Political composition ==
=== Senate ===
	Party (Shading indicates majority caucus)			Total	Vacant
	Republican	Democratic	Forward	Total	Vacant
End of the previous Legislature	22	6	1	29	0
Begin 2027	21	8	0	29	0
Latest voting share	72%	28%	0%		

=== House of Representatives ===
	Party (Shading indicates majority caucus)			Total	Vacant
	Republican	Democratic	Independent	Total	Vacant
End of the previous Legislature	61	14	0	75	0
Begin 2027	45	28	2	75	0
Latest voting share	60%	37%	3%		

== Leadership ==
=== Senate leadership ===
Position	Name	Party	District
President of the Senate	Evan Vickers	Republican	28
Majority Leader	Chris H. Wilson	Republican	2
Majority Whip	Mike McKell	Republican	25
Assistant Majority Whip	Keven Stratton	Republican	24
Minority Leader	Luz Escamilla	Democratic	10
Minority Whip	Karen Kwan	Democratic	12
Assistant Minority Whip	Jennifer Plumb	Democratic	9
Source: Salt Lake Tribune

=== House leadership ===
Position	Name	Party	District
Speaker of the House	Mike Schultz	Republican	12
Majority Leader	Casey Snider	Republican	5
Majority Whip	Candice Pierucci	Republican	49
Assistant Majority Whip	Cal Roberts	Republican	46
Minority Leader	Jennifer Dailey-Provost	Democratic	22
Minority Whip	Doug Owens	Democratic	33
Assistant Minority Whip	Ashlee Matthews	Democratic	37
Source: Salt Lake Tribune

== Membership ==
=== Senate membership ===
District	Name	Party	Counties represented	Assumed office
1	Scott Sandall	Rep	Box Elder, Cache, Tooele	2019 (Note: Previously served in the Utah House of Representatives.)
2	Chris H. Wilson	Rep	Cache, Rich	2021
3	John D. Johnson	Rep	Morgan, Summit, Weber	2021
4	Cal Musselman	Rep	Davis, Weber	2025
5	Christina Hernandez	Dem	Davis, Morgan, Weber	2027
6	Tami Tran	Rep	Davis	2027
7	Stephanie Hollist	Rep	Davis	2027
8	Todd Weiler	Rep	Davis, Salt Lake	2012 (Note: Originally appointed to office.)
9	Jennifer Plumb	Dem	Salt Lake	2023
10	Luz Escamilla	Dem	Salt Lake	2009
11			Salt Lake, Utah, Tooele	
12	Karen Kwan	Dem	Salt Lake	2023
13	Silvia Catten	Dem	Salt Lake	2027
14	Stephanie Pitcher	Dem	Salt Lake	2023
15	Kathleen Riebe	Dem	Salt Lake	2019
16	Wayne Harper	Rep	Salt Lake	2013
17	Lincoln Fillmore	Rep	Salt Lake	2016
18	Doug Fiefia	Rep	Salt Lake, Utah	2027
19	Shana Anderson	Dem	Salt Lake, Utah	2027
20	Ronald Winterton	Rep	Daggett, Duchesne, Summit, Uintah, Wasatch	2019
21	Brady Brammer	Rep	Utah	2025
22	Heidi Balderree	Rep	Salt Lake, Utah	2023
23	Keith Grover	Rep	Utah	2018
24	Keven Stratton	Rep	Utah, Wasatch	2025 (Note: Previously served in the Utah House of Representatives, appointed in 2012)
25	Mike McKell	Rep	Utah	2021
26	David Hinkins	Rep	Carbon, Emery, Garfield, Grand, Kane, San Juan, Utah, Wasatch, Wayne	2009
27	Derrin Owens	Rep	Garfield, Juab, Kane, Millard, Piute, Sanpete, Sevier, Utah, Washington, Wayne	2021
28	Evan Vickers	Rep	Beaver, Iron, Juab, Millard, Washington	2013
29	Don Ipson	Rep	Washington	2016
Sources: Utah Legislature, New York Times

=== House membership ===
District	Name	Party	Counties represented	Assumed office
1	Thomas W. Peterson	Rep	Box Elder, Cache	2022
2	Michael J. Petersen	Rep	Cache	2021
3	Patrick Belmont	Ind	Cache	2027
4	Zane Woolstenhulme	Dem	Daggett, Duchesne, Morgan, Rich, Summit	2027
5	Casey Snider	Rep	Cache	2018
6	Matthew H. Gwynn	Rep	Box Elder, Weber	2021
7	Ryan D. Wilcox	Rep	Weber	2021 (also 2009–2014)
8	Kim James	Dem	Morgan, Weber	2027
9	Angela Choberka	Dem	Weber	2027
10	Rosemary Lesser	Dem	Weber	2021 (Note: lost election in 2024, re-elected in 2026)
11	Katy Hall	Rep	Davis, Weber	2023
12	Mike Schultz	Rep	Davis, Weber	2015
13	Erik Craythorne	Rep	Davis	2027
14	John Taylor	Rep	Davis	2027
15	Ariel Defay	Rep	Davis	2023
16	Bob Stevenson	Rep	Davis	2027
17	Lili Bitner	Rep	Davis	2027
18	Paul A. Cutler	Rep	Davis	2023
19	Raymond P. Ward	Rep	Davis	2015
20	Phil Graves	Dem	Davis	2027
21	Stephen Otterstrom	Dem	Salt Lake	2027
22	Jennifer Dailey-Provost	Dem	Salt Lake	2019
23	Hoang Nguyen	Dem	Salt Lake, Summit	2025
24	Grant Amjad Miller	Dem	Salt Lake	2025
25	Angela Romero	Dem	Salt Lake	2013
26	Michael Finch	Dem	Salt Lake	2027
27	Liz Oates	Dem	Salt Lake	2027
28	Nicholeen Peck	Rep	Tooele	2025
29	Sheldon Birch	Rep	Juab, Millard, Tooele	2027
30	Jake Fitisemanu	Dem	Salt Lake	2025
31	Verona Mauga	Dem	Salt Lake	2025
32	Sahara Hayes	Dem	Salt Lake	2023
33	Doug Owens	Dem	Salt Lake	2021
34	Julie Jackson	Dem	Salt Lake	2027
35	Rosalba Dominguez	Dem	Salt Lake	2025
36	Blake Townsend	Dem	Salt Lake	2027
37	Ashlee Matthews	Dem	Salt Lake	2021
38	Sergio Sotelo	Ind	Salt Lake	2027
39	Drew Howells	Dem	Salt Lake	2027
40	Andrew Stoddard	Dem	Salt Lake	2019
41	Gay Lynn Bennion	Dem	Salt Lake	2021
42	Iva Williams	Dem	Salt Lake	2027
43	Ofa Matagi	Dem	Salt Lake	2017
44	Jess Birtcher	Dem	Salt Lake	2027
45	Tracy Miller	Rep	Salt Lake	2025
46	Calvin Roberts	Rep	Salt Lake	2025
47	Mark A. Strong	Rep	Salt Lake	2019
48	Jake Hunsaker	Rep	Salt Lake	2027
49	Candice P. Pierucci	Rep	Salt Lake	2019
50	Stephanie Gricius	Rep	Utah	2023
51	Jefferson Moss	Rep	Utah	2017
52	A. Cory Maloy	Rep	Utah	2017
53	Kay J. Christofferson	Rep	Utah	2013
54	Kristen Chevrier	Rep	Utah	2025
55	Jon Hawkins	Rep	Utah	2019
56	Val L. Peterson	Rep	Utah	2011
57	Nelson T. Abbott	Rep	Utah	2021
58	David Shallenberger	Rep	Utah	2025
59			Summit, Wasatch	
60	Tyler Clancy	Rep	Utah	2023
61	Lisa Shepherd	Rep	Utah	2025
62	David Chappell	Dem	Utah	2027
63	Stephen L. Whyte	Rep	Utah	2021
64	Jefferson S. Burton	Rep	Utah	2021
65	Douglas R. Welton	Rep	Utah	2021
66	Troy Shelley	Rep	Juab, Sanpete	2025
67	JR Bird	Rep	Carbon, Duchesne, Emery, Grand	2027
68	Scott H. Chew	Rep	Duchesne, Uintah	2015
69	Logan Monson	Rep	Emery, Garfield, Grand, Kane, San Juan, Wayne	2025
70	Carl R. Albrecht	Rep	Beaver, Iron, Piute, Sevier	2017
71	Rex Shipp	Rep	Iron	2019
72	Joseph Elison	Rep	Washington	2023
73	Colin W. Jack	Rep	Washington	2022
74	R. Neil Walter	Rep	Washington	2023
75	Walt Brooks	Rep	Washington	2016
Sources: Utah Legislature, New York Times

== See also ==
- List of Utah State Legislatures
