= 2024 Utah House of Representatives election =

- November 5, 2024

All 75 seats in the Utah House of Representatives 38 seats needed for a majority
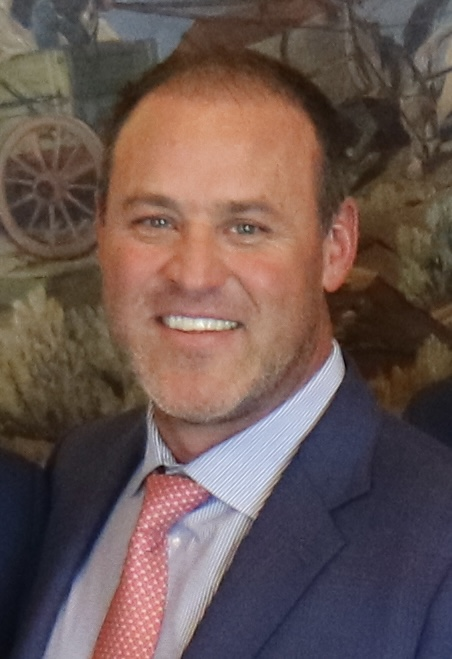

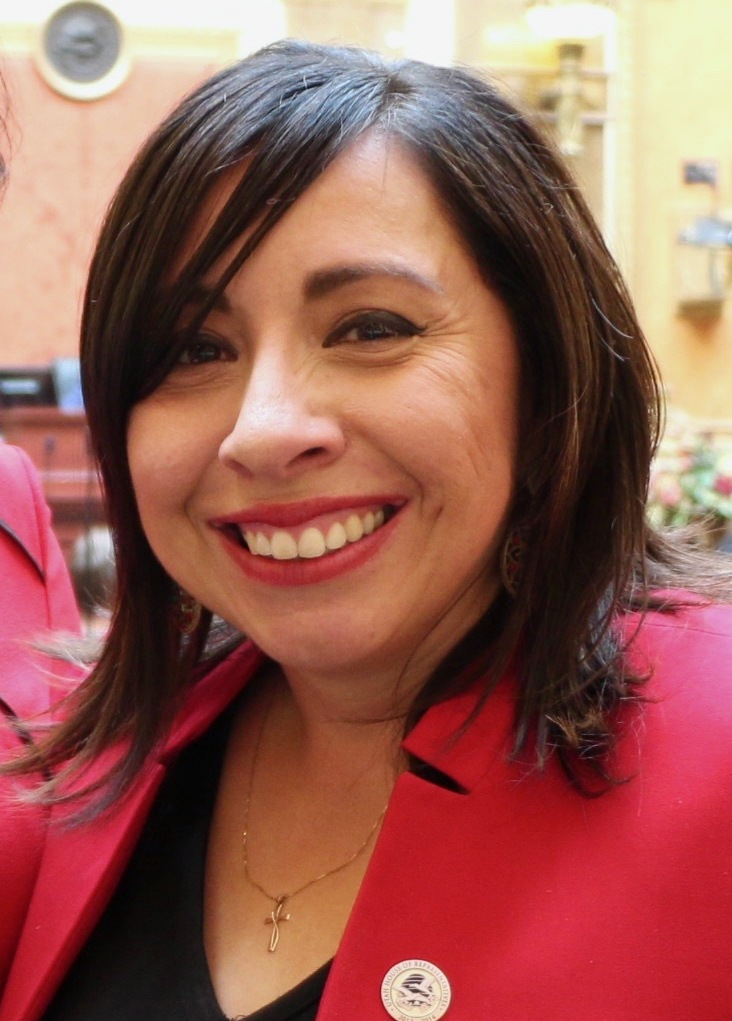
	Majority party	Minority party
Leader	Mike Schultz	Angela Romero
Party	Republican	Democratic
Leader since	November 15, 2023	January 17, 2023
Leader's seat	HD 12–Hooper	HD 25–Salt Lake City
Last election	61 seats, 70.0%	14 seats, 25.3%
Seats won	61	14
Seat change	Steady	Steady
Popular vote	944,629	372,020
Percentage	69.94%	27.54%
Swing	▼0.09%	▲2.22%
- Republican gain Democratic gain Republican hold Democratic hold 40–50% 50–60% 60–70% 70–80% 80–90% >90% 50–60% 60–70% 70–80% >90%
Speaker before election
Mike Schultz
Republican
Elected Speaker
Mike Schultz
Republican

The 2024 Utah House of Representatives elections were held on November 5, 2024, as part of the biennial 2024 United States elections. All 75 seats in the Utah House of Representatives were up for election for the 66th Legislature. The filing deadline for candidates was January 8, 2024. Primary elections were held on June 24, 2024. The elections coincided with elections for other offices in Utah, including for Governor, US Senate, US House, and the Utah Senate.

== Partisan background ==
In the 2020 presidential election in Utah, Republican Donald Trump won the most votes in 58 House of Representatives Districts and Democrat Joe Biden won the most votes in 17 districts. Going into the 2024 Utah House of Representatives election, Democrats represented one district where Trump won the most votes in 2020: District 10, located in Ogden ( Trump + 3%). Going into the election, Republicans represented four districts where Biden won the most votes in 2020, all located in the suburbs of Salt Lake County: District 26 ( Biden + 4%); District 30 (Biden + 6%); District 42 (Biden + 0.08%) and District 43 (Biden + 5%).

Biden 40–50% 50–60% 60–70% 70–80% 80–90% / Trump 40–50% 50–60% 60–70% 70–80% 80–90%

== Retirements ==
Thirteen incumbents did not seek re-election.

=== Republicans ===
1. District 3: Dan Johnson is retiring.
2. District 9: Cal Musselman is retiring to run for State Senate.
3. District 28: Tim Jimenez is retiring.
4. District 30: Judy Weeks-Rohner is retiring to run for State Senate.
5. District 42: Robert Spendlove is retiring.
6. District 45: Susan Pulsipher is retiring.
7. District 48: Jay Cobb is retiring.
8. District 58: Keven Stratton is retiring to run for State Senate.
9. District 61: Marsha Judkins is retiring.
10. District 66: Steven Lund is retiring.
11. District 69: Phil Lyman is retiring to run for Governor.

=== Democrats ===
1. District 23: Brian King is retiring to run for Governor.
2. District 35: Mark Wheatley is retiring.

== Incumbents defeated ==
=== At convention ===
One incumbent representative was defeated in the March 30 Salt Lake County Democratic convention.

==== Democrats ====
1. District 31: Brett Garner lost nomination to a full term to Verona Mauga.

=== In primary election ===
Two incumbent representatives, one Democrat and one Republican, were defeated in the June 25 primary election.

==== Democrats ====
1. District 24: Joel Briscoe lost renomination to Grant Miller.

==== Republicans ====
1. District 46: Jeff Stenquist lost renomination to Cal Roberts.

== Predictions ==
Source	Ranking	As of
CNalysis	Solid R	March 26, 2024

== Summary ==
Summary of the November 5, 2024 Utah House of Representatives election
Party	Candidates (Note: One candidate per district)	Votes		Seats				
Party	Candidates	No.	%	Before	Up	Won	After	+/–
Republican	74	944,629	69.94%	61	61	61	61	Steady
Democratic	50	372,020	27.54%	14	14	14	14	Steady
United Utah	7	11,859	0.88%	0	0	0	0	Steady
Utah Forward	3	4,783	0.35%	0	0	0	0	Steady
Constitution	2	1,560	0.12%	0	0	0	0	Steady
Libertarian	2	4,725	0.35%	0	0	0	0	Steady
Independent	2	14,100	1.04%	0	0	0	0	Steady
Total		1,350,688	100.0%	75	75	75	75	Steady

=== Close races ===
Districts where the margin of victory was under 10%:

1. District 10, 1.96% (gain)
2. District 35, 3.92%
3. District 30, 5.06% (gain)
4. District 26, 7.24%
5. District 3, 8.04%
6. District 42, 9.06%
7. District 37, 9.48%

== Uncontested elections ==
In the following districts, only one candidate filed to run before the deadline:

=== Republicans ===
- HD 7 – Ryan Wilcox, incumbent
- HD 8 – Jason Kyle, incumbent
- HD 11 – Katy Hall, incumbent
- HD 14 – Karianne Lisonbee, incumbent
- HD 36 – Jim Dunnigan, speaker pro tempore, incumbent
- HD 50 – Stephanie Gricius, incumbent
- HD 51 – Jefferson Moss, majority leader, incumbent
- HD 54 – Brady Brammer, incumbent
- HD 55 – Jon Hawkins, incumbent
- HD 56 – Val Peterson, incumbent
- HD 60 – Tyler Clancy, incumbent
- HD 72 – Joseph Elison, incumbent
- HD 73 – Colin Jack, incumbent
- HD 74 – Neil Walter, incumbent

== House District 1 ==
=== Democratic primary ===
Candidates

- Claudia Bigler
- Chris Reid (eliminated at convention)

Utah’s 1st House District Democratic convention, 2024
Party	Candidate	Votes	%
Democratic	Claudia Bigler	3	100
Democratic	Chris Reid	0	0
Total votes		3	

=== Republican primary ===
Candidate

- Thomas Peterson, incumbent

=== General election ===
Utah’s 1st House District General Election, 2024
Party	Candidate	Votes	%
Republican	Thomas Peterson	17,308	82.36%
Democratic	Claudia Bigler	3,707	17.64%
Total votes		21,015	100%

== House District 2 ==
=== Democratic primary ===
Candidate

- Tom Liljegren

=== Republican primary ===
Candidates

- Michael Petersen, incumbent
- Mike Monson

Utah’s 2nd House District Republican primary, 2024
Party	Candidate	Votes	%
Republican	Mike Petersen (incumbent)	3,765	58.78%
Republican	Mike Monson	2,640	41.22%
Total votes		6,405	100.00%

=== General election ===
Utah's 2nd House District General Election, 2024
Party	Candidate	Votes	%
Republican	Mike Petersen	14,303	73.97%
Democratic	Tom Liljegren	5,032	26.03%
Total votes		19,335	100%

== House District 3 ==
=== Republican primary ===
Candidate

- Jason Thompson

Withdrawn

- Paul Borup

=== Independents ===
Candidate

- Patrick Belmont

=== General election ===
Utah's 3rd House District General Election, 2024
Party	Candidate	Votes	%
Republican	Jason Thompson	8,209	54.02%
Independent	Patrick Belmont	6,988	45.98%
Total votes		15,197	100%

== House District 4 ==
=== Democratic primary ===
Candidate

- Kris Campbell

=== Republican primary ===
Candidate

- Kera Birkeland (incumbent)

=== General election ===
Utah’s 4th House District general election, 2024
Party	Candidate	Votes	%
Republican	Kera Birkeland (incumbent)	14,799	59.54%
Democratic	Kris Campbell	10,055	40.46%
Total votes		24,854	100%

== House District 5 ==
=== Republican primary ===
Candidate

- Casey Snider (incumbent)

=== Utah Forward primary ===
Candidate

- Cary Youmans

=== General election ===
Utah’s 5th House District general election, 2024
Party	Candidate	Votes	%
Republican	Casey Snider (incumbent)	17,572	100%
Total votes		17,572	100%

== House District 6 ==
=== Democratic primary ===
Candidate

- Amber Hardy

=== Republican primary ===
Candidates

- Jon Beesley
- Matthew Gwynn (incumbent)

Utah’s 6th House District Republican primary, 2024
Party	Candidate	Votes	%
Republican	Jon Beesley		
Republican	Matthew Gwynn (incumbent)		
Total votes			

=== General election ===
Utah's 6th House District General Election, 2024
Party	Candidate	Votes	%
Republican	Matthew Gwynn	16,376	79.93%
Democratic	Amber Hardy	4,111	20.07%
Total votes		20,487	100%

== House District 7 ==
Incumbent Ryan Wilcox is running unopposed in both the Republican primary and the general election.

Utah’s 7th House District general election, 2024
Party	Candidate	Votes	%
Republican	Ryan Wilcox (incumbent)	13,190	100%
Total votes		13,190	100%

== House District 8 ==
Incumbent Jason Kyle is running unopposed in both the Republican primary and the general election.

Utah’s 8th House District general election, 2024
Party	Candidate	Votes	%
Republican	Jason Kyle (incumbent)	13,292	100%
Total votes		13,292	100%

== House District 9 ==
=== Democratic primary ===
Candidate

- Angela Choberka

=== Libertarian primary ===
Candidate

- Jacob Johnson

=== Republican primary ===
Candidate

- Jake Sawyer

=== General election ===
Utah’s 9th House District general election, 2024
Party	Candidate	Votes	%
Republican	Jake Sawyer	9,497	58.29%
Democratic	Angela Choberka	5,996	36.80%
Libertarian	Jacob Johnson	799	4.9%
Total votes		16,292	100%

== House District 10 ==
=== Democratic primary ===
Candidate

- Rosemary Lesser (incumbent)

=== Republican primary ===
Candidates

- Jill Koford
- Nacho Valdez

Utah’s 10th House District Republican primary, 2024
Party	Candidate	Votes	%
Republican	Jill Koford		
Republican	Nacho Valdez		
Total votes			

=== General election ===
Utah's 10th House District General Election, 2024
Party	Candidate	Votes	%
Republican	Jill Koford	8,018	50.98%
Democratic	Rosemary Lesser (incumbent)	7,709	49.02%
Total votes		15,727	100%

== House District 11 ==
Incumbent Katy Hall is running unopposed in both the Republican primary and the general election.

Utah’s 11th House District general election, 2024
Party	Candidate	Votes	%
Republican	Katy Hall (incumbent)	11,945	100%
Total votes		11,945	100%

== House District 12 ==
=== Democratic primary ===
Candidate

- Sharon Hilton

=== Republican primary ===
Candidates

- Korry Green
- Mike Schultz (incumbent)

Utah’s 12th House District Republican primary, 2024
Party	Candidate	Votes	%
Republican	Korry Green		
Republican	Mike Schultz (incumbent)		
Total votes			

=== General election ===
Utah's 12th House District General Election, 2024
Party	Candidate	Votes	%
Republican	Mike Schultz	14,126	72.87%
Democratic	Sharon Hilton	5,260	27.13%
Total votes		19,386	100%

== House District 13 ==
=== Democratic primary ===
Candidate

- Lorri Rogers

=== Republican primary ===
Candidates

- Curtis Beames
- Karen M. Peterson (incumbent)

Utah’s 13th House District Republican primary, 2024
Party	Candidate	Votes	%
Republican	Curtis Beames		
Republican	Karen M. Peterson (incumbent)		
Total votes			

=== General election ===
Utah's 13th House District General Election, 2024
Party	Candidate	Votes	%
Republican	Karen M. Peterson	12,391	71.85%
Democratic	Lorri Rogers	4,854	28.15%
Total votes		17,245	100%

== House District 14 ==
Incumbent Karianne Lisonbee is running unopposed in both the Republican primary and the general election.

Utah’s 14th House District general election, 2024
Party	Candidate	Votes	%
Republican	Karianne Lisonbee (incumbent)	12,947	100%
Total votes		12,947	100%

== House District 15 ==
=== Republican primary ===
Candidate

- Ariel Defay (incumbent)

=== Utah Forward primary ===
Candidate

- Josh Smith

=== General election ===
Utah’s 15 House District general election, 2024
Party	Candidate	Votes	%
Republican	Ariel Defay (incumbent)	14,904	75.70%
Utah Forward	Josh Smith	4,783	24.30%
Total votes		19,687	100%

== House District 16 ==
=== Republican primary ===
Candidates

- Trevor Lee (incumbent)
- Daniela Harding

=== Democratic primary ===
Candidate

- Zeaid Hasan

=== General election ===
Utah's 16th House District General Election, 2024
Party	Candidate	Votes	%
Republican	Trevor Lee	11,510	65.28%
Democratic	Zeaid Hasan	6,123	34.72%
Total votes		17,633	100%

== House District 17 ==
=== Republican primary ===
Candidates

- Stewart Barlow (incumbent)
- Jennifer Garner

Utah’s 17th House District Republican primary, 2024
Party	Candidate	Votes	%
Republican	Stewart Barlow (incumbent)	4,643	64.06%
Republican	Jennifer Garner	2,605	35.94%
Total votes		7,248	100.00%

=== Libertarian primary ===
Candidate

- Adam Feller

=== General election ===
Utah's 17th House District General Election, 2024
Party	Candidate	Votes	%
Republican	Stewart Barlow	14,694	78.92%
Utah Libertarian Party	Adam Feller	3,926	21.08%
Total votes		18,620	100%

== House District 18 ==
=== Republican primary ===
Candidate

- Paul Culter (incumbent)

=== Democratic primary ===
Candidates

- Steve Hartwick
- Mark Whitaker

=== General election ===
Utah's 18th House District General Election, 2024
Party	Candidate	Votes	%
Republican	Paul A. Cutler	14,816	72.55%
Democratic	Steve Hartwick	5,607	27.45%
Total votes		20,423	100%

== House District 19 ==
=== Republican primary ===
Candidates

- Raymond Ward (incumbent)
- Tenna Hartman

=== Democratic primary ===
Candidates

- Nick Wadsworth

=== Constitution primary ===
Candidate

- Cameron Dransfield

=== General election ===
Utah's 19th House District General Election, 2024
Party	Candidate	Votes	%
Republican	Raymond Ward	13,620	66.73%
Democratic	Nick Wadsworth	5,232	25.63%
Constitution	Cameron Dransfield	1,560	7.64%
Total votes		20,412	100%

== House District 20 ==
=== Republican primary ===
Candidate

- Melissa Garff Ballard (incumbent)

=== Democratic primary ===
Candidate

- Lew Jeppson

=== General election ===
Utah's 20th House District General Election, 2024
Party	Candidate	Votes	%
Republican	Melissa Garff Ballard	11,381	66.06%
Democratic	Lew Jeppson	5,848	33.94%
Total votes		17,229	100%

== House District 21 ==
=== Republican primary ===
Candidates

- David Atkin
- Taylor Aaron Bunot

=== Democratic primary ===
Candidate

- Sandra Hollins (incumbent)

=== General election ===
Utah's 21st House District General Election, 2024
Party	Candidate	Votes	%
Democratic	Sandra Hollins	8,818	71.42%
Republican	David Atkin	3,529	28.58%
Total votes		12,347	100%

== House District 22 ==
=== Republican primary ===
Candidate

- Steve Harmsen

=== Democratic primary ===
Candidates

- Jennifer Dailey-Provost (incumbent)
- Jakey Sala Siolo

=== General election ===
Utah's 22nd House District General Election, 2024
Party	Candidate	Votes	%
Democratic	Jennifer Dailey-Provost	15,886	79.56%
Republican	Steve Harmsen	4,082	20.44%
Total votes		19,968	100%

== House District 23 ==
=== Republican primary ===
Candidate

- M. Scott Romney

=== Democratic primary ===
Candidates

- Jeff Howell
- Hoang Nguyen

=== United Utah primary ===
Candidate

- Cabot Wm. Nelson

=== General election ===
Utah's 23rd House District General Election, 2024
Party	Candidate	Votes	%
Democratic	Hoang Nguyen	17,821	71.66%
Republican	M. Scott Romney	6,566	26.40%
United Utah Party	Cabot WM. Nelson	481	1.93%
Total votes		24,868	100%

== House District 24 ==
=== Republican primary ===
Candidate

- David R. Spjut

=== Democratic primary ===
Candidates

- Joel Briscoe (incumbent)
- Ramón Barthelemy
- Grant Amjad Miller

=== General election ===
Utah's 24th House District General Election, 2024
Party	Candidate	Votes	%
Democratic	Grant Amjad Miller	16,639	100%
Total votes		16,639	100%

== House District 25 ==
=== Republican primary ===
Candidates

- Richard Nowak
- 'Alama 'Ulu'ave

=== Democratic primary ===
Candidate

- Angela Romero (incumbent)

=== General election ===
Utah's 25th House District General Election, 2024
Party	Candidate	Votes	%
Democratic	Angela Romero	5,700	63.69%
Republican	Richard Nowak	3,249	36.31%
Total votes		8,949	100%

== House District 26 ==
=== Republican primary ===
Candidate

- Matt MacPherson (incumbent)

=== Democratic primary ===
Candidate

- Jeanetta Williams

=== General election ===
Utah's 26th House District General Election, 2024
Party	Candidate	Votes	%
Republican	Matt MacPherson	7,338	53.62%
Democratic	Jeanetta Williams	6,347	46.38%
Total votes		13,685	100%

== House District 27 ==
=== Republican primary ===
Candidate

- Anthony Edward Loubet

=== Democratic primary ===
Candidate

- Dawn Stevenson

=== General election ===
Utah's 27th House District General Election, 2024
Party	Candidate	Votes	%
Republican	Anthony Loubet	8,175	55.72%
Democratic	Dawn Stevenson	6,496	44.28%
Total votes		14,671	100%

== House District 28 ==
=== Republican primary ===
Candidates

- Nicholeen P. Peck
- Timothy Adrian Jimenez (withdrew)

=== Democratic primary ===
Candidate

- Fred L Baker

=== General election ===
Utah's 28th House District General Election, 2024
Party	Candidate	Votes	%
Republican	Nicholeen Peck	11,863	68.94%
Democratic	Fred Baker	5,344	31.06%
Total votes		17,207	100%

== House District 29 ==
=== Republican primary ===
Candidate

- Bridger Bolinder

=== Democratic primary ===
Candidates

- Ron Draper
- Brad Bartholomew (withdrew)

=== General election ===
Utah's 29th House District General Election, 2024
Party	Candidate	Votes	%
Republican	Bridger Bolinder	15,955	75.42%
Democratic	Ron Draper	5,201	24.58%
Total votes		21,156	100%

== House District 30 ==
=== Republican primary ===
Candidate

- Fred Cox
- Dave Parke
- Cindy Thompson

=== Democratic primary ===
Candidate

- Jake Fitisemanu
- Sophia Hawes-Tingey

=== General election ===
Utah's 30th House District General Election, 2024
Party	Candidate	Votes	%
Democratic	Jake Fitisemanu	7,371	52.53%
Republican	Fred Cox	6,662	47.47%
Total votes		14,033	100%

== House District 31 ==
=== Republican primary ===
Candidate

- Bill Swan
- Andrew G. Nieto (withdrew)
- Russ Moore (withdrew)

=== Democratic primary ===
Candidate

- Verona Mauga
- Brett Gardner

=== General election ===
Utah's 31st House District General Election, 2024
Party	Candidate	Votes	%
Democratic	Verona Mauga	7,148	57.90%
Republican	Bill Swann	5,198	42.10%
Total votes		12,346	100%

== House District 32 ==
=== Republican primary ===
Candidate

- Sarah Dawn Montes
- Jerry Schmidt (withdrew)

=== Democratic primary ===
Candidate

- Sahara Hayes

=== United Utah primary ===
Candidate

- Adam Christopher Bean (withdrew)

=== General election ===
Utah's 32nd House District General Election, 2024
Party	Candidate	Votes	%
Democratic	Sahara Hayes	12,158	72.65%
Republican	Sarah Dawn Montes	4,576	27.35%
Total votes		16,734	100%

== House District 33 ==
=== Republican primary ===
Candidate

- Sheryl R Fraser
- Henry Billy Malone

=== Democratic primary ===
Candidate

- Doug Owens

=== General election ===
Utah's 33rd House District General Election, 2024
Party	Candidate	Votes	%
Democratic	Doug Owens	16,863	68.03%
Republican	Sheryl R. Fraser	7,923	31.97%
Total votes		24,786	100%

== House District 34 ==
=== Republican primary ===
Candidate

- Karl J. Jurek

=== Democratic primary ===
Candidate

- Carol Spackman Moss

=== United Utah primary ===
Candidate

- Dennis Roach

=== General election ===
Utah's 34th House District General Election, 2024
Party	Candidate	Votes	%
Democratic	Carol Spackman Moss	13,125	62.96%
Republican	Karl Jurek	7,202	34.55%
United Utah Party	Dennis Roach	519	2.49%
Total votes		20,846	100%

== House District 35 ==
=== General election ===
Utah's 35th House District General Election, 2024
Party	Candidate	Votes	%
Democratic	Rosalba Dominguez	9,139	51.96%
Republican	Mike Bird	8,451	48.04%
Total votes		17,590	100%

== House District 36 ==
=== General election ===
Utah's 36th House District General Election, 2024
Party	Candidate	Votes	%
Republican	Jim Dunnigan	13,333	100%
Total votes		13,333	100%

== House District 37 ==
=== General election ===
Utah's 37th House District General Election, 2024
Party	Candidate	Votes	%
Democratic	Ashlee Matthews	6,541	54.74%
Republican	Paul Douglas Johnson	5,409	45.26%
Total votes		11,950	100%

== House District 38 ==
=== General election ===
Utah's 38th House District General Election, 2024
Party	Candidate	Votes	%
Republican	Cheryl Acton	9,921	61.41%
Democratic	Steven Laude Jr.	6,235	38.59%
Total votes		16,156	100%

== House District 39 ==
=== General election ===
Utah's 39th House District General Election, 2024
Party	Candidate	Votes	%
Republican	Ken Ivory	8,799	55.30%
Independent	Jessica Wignall	7,112	44.70%
Total votes		15,911	100%

== House District 40 ==
=== General election ===
Utah's 40th House District General Election, 2024
Party	Candidate	Votes	%
Democratic	Andrew Stoddard	8,883	57.34%
Republican	Tyler Glaittli	6,126	39.54%
United Utah Party	John Jackson	483	3.12%
Total votes		15,492	100%

== House District 41 ==
=== General election ===
Utah's 41st House District General Election, 2024
Party	Candidate	Votes	%
Democratic	Gay Lynn Bennion	15,206	63.82%
Republican	Roy Piskadlo	8,622	36.18%
Total votes		23,828	100%

== House District 42 ==
=== General election ===
Utah's 42nd House District General Election, 2024
Party	Candidate	Votes	%
Republican	Clint Okerlund	13,557	54.53%
Democratic	Travis Smith	11,303	45.47%
Total votes		24,860	100%

== House District 43 ==
=== General election ===
Utah's 43rd House District General Election, 2024
Party	Candidate	Votes	%
Republican	Steve Eliason	11,354	56.17%
Democratic	Jason R. Barber	8,861	43.83%
Total votes		20,215	100%

== House District 44 ==
=== General election ===
Utah's 44th House District General Election, 2024
Party	Candidate	Votes	%
Republican	Jordan Teuscher	13,359	61.01%
Democratic	Greg Green	8,539	38.99%
Total votes		21,898	100%

== House District 45 ==
=== General election ===
Utah's 45th House District General Election, 2024
Party	Candidate	Votes	%
Republican	Tracy Miller	13,930	66.97%
Democratic	Sara Rose Cimmers	6,871	33.03%
Total votes		13,930	100%

== House District 46 ==
=== General election ===
Utah's 46th House District General Election, 2024
Party	Candidate	Votes	%
Republican	Cal Roberts	16,757	100%
Total votes		16,757	100%

== House District 47 ==
=== General election ===
Utah's 47th House District General Election, 2024
Party	Candidate	Votes	%
Republican	Mark Ashby Strong	15,170	75.08%
United Utah Party	David Lundgren	5,034	24.92%
Total votes		20,204	100%

== House District 48 ==
=== General election ===
Utah's 48th House District General Election, 2024
Party	Candidate	Votes	%
Republican	Doug Fiefia	13,054	63.81%
Democratic	Stephen J. Middleton	7,405	36.19%
Total votes		20,459	100%

== House District 49 ==
=== General election ===
Utah's 49th House District General Election, 2024
Party	Candidate	Votes	%
Republican	Candice Pierucci	14,166	69.02%
Democratic	Samuel Winkler	6,358	30.98%
Total votes		20,524	100%

== House District 50 ==
=== General election ===
Utah's 50th House District General Election, 2024
Party	Candidate	Votes	%
Republican	Stephanie Gricius	17,414	100%
Total votes		17,414	100%

== House District 51 ==
=== General election ===
Utah's 51st House District General Election, 2024
Party	Candidate	Votes	%
Republican	Jefferson Moss	20,013	100%
Total votes		20,013	100%

== House District 52 ==
=== General election ===
Utah's 52nd House District General Election, 2024
Party	Candidate	Votes	%
Republican	Cory Maloy	15,166	73.60%
Democratic	Michael Keller	5,440	26.40%
Total votes		20,606	100%

== House District 53 ==
=== General election ===
Utah's 53rd House District General Election, 2024
Party	Candidate	Votes	%
Republican	Kay Christofferson	15,791	80.02%
United Utah Party	Alex Day	3,943	19.98%
Total votes		19,734	100%

== House District 54 ==
=== General election ===
Utah's 54th House District General Election, 2024
Party	Candidate	Votes	%
Republican	Brady Brammer	19,780	100%
Total votes		19,780	100%

== House District 55 ==
=== General election ===
Utah's 55th House District General Election, 2024
Party	Candidate	Votes	%
Republican	Jon Hawkins	16,745	100%
Total votes		16,745	100%

== House District 56 ==
=== General election ===
Utah's 56th House District General Election, 2024
Party	Candidate	Votes	%
Republican	Val Peterson	12,338	100%
Total votes		12,338	100%

== House District 57 ==
=== General election ===
Utah's 57th House District General Election, 2024
Party	Candidate	Votes	%
Republican	Nelson Abbott	12,553	72.53%
Democratic	Alan Keele	4,755	27.47%
Total votes		17,308	100%

== House District 58 ==
=== General election ===
Utah's 58th House District General Election, 2024
Party	Candidate	Votes	%
Republican	David Shallenberger	16,431	76.15%
Democratic	Joshua Sorensen	5,147	23.85%
Total votes		21,578	100%

== House District 59 ==
=== General election ===
Utah's 59th House District General Election, 2024
Party	Candidate	Votes	%
Republican	Mike Kohler	14,241	59.24%
Democratic	Julie Monahan	9,798	40.76%
Total votes		24,039	100%

== House District 60 ==
=== General election ===
Utah's 60th House District General Election, 2024
Party	Candidate	Votes	%
Republican	Tyler Clancy	6,738	100%
Total votes		6,738	100%

== House District 61 ==
=== General election ===
Utah's 61st House District General Election, 2024
Party	Candidate	Votes	%
Republican	Lisa Shepherd	11,946	100%
Total votes		11,946	100%

== House District 62 ==
=== General election ===
Utah's 62nd House District General Election, 2024
Party	Candidate	Votes	%
Republican	Norm Thurston	9,286	65.49%
Democratic	Kevin Slater	4,894	34.51%
Total votes		14,180	100%

== House District 63 ==
=== General election ===
Utah's 63rd House District General Election, 2024
Party	Candidate	Votes	%
Republican	Stephen L. Whyte	18,412	80.30%
Democratic	Mark Youngquist	4,518	19.70%
Total votes		22,930	100%

== House District 64 ==
=== General election ===
Utah's 64th House District General Election, 2024
Party	Candidate	Votes	%
Republican	Jeff Burton	17,179	84.20%
Democratic	Rick Dougan	3,224	15.80%
Total votes		20,403	100%

== House District 65 ==
=== General election ===
Utah's 65th House District General Election, 2024
Party	Candidate	Votes	%
Republican	Doug Welton	17,734	84.02%
Democratic	Joseph Hansen	3,373	15.98%
Total votes		21,107	100%

== House District 66 ==
=== General election ===
Utah's 66th House District General Election, 2024
Party	Candidate	Votes	%
Republican	Troy Shelley	17,111	100%
Total votes		17,111	100%

== House District 67 ==
=== General election ===
Utah's 67th House District General Election, 2024
Party	Candidate	Votes	%
Republican	Christine Watkins	14,175	75.46%
Democratic	Joe Christman	4,611	24.54%
Total votes		18,786	100%

== House District 68 ==
=== General election ===
Utah's 68th House District General Election, 2024
Party	Candidate	Votes	%
Republican	Scott Chew	17,491	100%
Total votes		17,491	100%

== House District 69 ==
=== General election ===
Utah's 69th House District General Election, 2024
Party	Candidate	Votes	%
Republican	Logan Monson	13,246	62.45%
Democratic	Davina Smith	7,963	37.55
Total votes		21,209	100%

== House District 70 ==
=== General election ===
Utah's 70th House District General Election, 2024
Party	Candidate	Votes	%
Republican	Carl Albrecht	19,523	93.31%
United Utah Party	Zeno Parry	1,399	6.69%
Total votes		20,922	100%

== House District 71 ==
=== General election ===
Utah's 71st House District General Election, 2024
Party	Candidate	Votes	%
Republican	Rex Shipp	15,413	78.10%
Democratic	Steve Merrill	4,322	21.90%
Total votes		19,735	100%

== House District 72 ==
=== General election ===
Utah's 72nd House District General Election, 2024
Party	Candidate	Votes	%
Republican	Joseph Elison	22,406	100%
Total votes		22,406	100%

== House District 73 ==
=== General election ===
Utah's 73rd House District General Election, 2024
Party	Candidate	Votes	%
Republican	Colin Jack	18,715	100%
Total votes		18,715	100%

== House District 74 ==
=== General election ===
Utah's 74th House District General Election, 2024
Party	Candidate	Votes	%
Republican	R. Neil Walter	19,978	100%
Total votes		19,978	100%

== House District 75 ==
=== General election ===
Utah's 75th House District General Election, 2024
Party	Candidate	Votes	%
Republican	Walt Brooks	15,580	78.83%
Democratic	Joshua Dutson	4,183	21.17%
Total votes		19,763	100%

== See also ==
- 2024 Utah gubernatorial election
- 2024 Utah Senate election
- 2024 United States Senate election in Utah
- 2024 United States House of Representatives elections in Utah
