= 65th Utah State Legislature =

The 65th session of the Utah State Legislature sat from 2023 to 2024. House members were elected at the 2022 Utah House of Representatives election.

== Members of the 65th House of Representatives ==
| District | Name | Party | Counties represented | Assumed office |
|---|---|---|---|---|
| 1 | Thomas W. Peterson | Rep | Box Elder, Cache | 2022* |
| 2 | Michael J. Petersen | Rep | Cache | 2021 |
| 3 | Dan N. Johnson | Rep | Cache | 2019 |
| 4 | Kera Birkeland | Rep | Daggett, Duchesne, Morgan, Rich, Summit | 2020* |
| 5 | Casey Snider | Rep | Cache | 2018* |
| 6 | Matthew H. Gwynn | Rep | Box Elder, Weber | 2021 |
| 7 | Ryan D. Wilcox | Rep | Weber | 2021 (2009–2014) |
| 8 | Jason B. Kyle | Rep | Morgan, Weber | 2023 |
| 9 | Calvin R. Musselman | Rep | Weber | 2019 |
| 10 | Rosemary T. Lesser | Dem | Weber | 2021* |
| 11 | Katy Hall | Rep | Davis, Weber | 2023 |
| 12 | Mike Schultz | Rep | Davis, Weber | 2015 |
| 13 | Karen M. Peterson | Rep | Davis | 2022* |
| 14 | Karianne Lisonbee | Rep | Davis | 2017 |
| 15 | Ariel Defay | Rep | Davis | 2023* |
| 16 | Trevor Lee | Rep | Davis | 2023 |
| 17 | Stewart E. Barlow | Rep | Davis | 2011* |
| 18 | Paul A. Cutler | Rep | Davis | 2023 |
| 19 | Raymond P. Ward | Rep | Davis | 2015 |
| 20 | Melissa G. Ballard | Rep | Davis | 2019 |
| 21 | Sandra Hollins | Dem | Salt Lake | 2015 |
| 22 | Jennifer Dailey-Provost | Dem | Salt Lake | 2019 |
| 23 | Brian S. King | Dem | Salt Lake, Summit | 2009 |
| 24 | Joel K. Briscoe | Dem | Salt Lake | 2010* |
| 25 | Angela Romero | Dem | Salt Lake | 2013 |
| 26 | Matt MacPherson | Rep | Salt Lake | 2023* |
| 27 | Anthony E. Loubet | Rep | Salt Lake | 2023 |
| 28 | Tim Jimenez | Rep | Tooele | 2023 |
| 29 | Bridger Bolinder | Rep | Juab, Millard, Tooele | 2023 |
| 30 | Judy Weeks-Rohner | Rep | Salt Lake | 2021* |
| 31 | Brett Garner | Dem | Salt Lake | 2023* |
| 32 | Sahara Hayes | Dem | Salt Lake | 2023 |
| 33 | Doug Owens | Dem | Salt Lake | 2021 |
| 34 | Carol S. Moss | Dem | Salt Lake | 2001 |
| 35 | Mark A. Wheatley | Dem | Salt Lake | 2005 |
| 36 | James A. Dunnigan | Rep | Salt Lake | 2003 |
| 37 | Ashlee Matthews | Dem | Salt Lake | 2021 |
| 38 | Cheryl K. Acton | Rep | Salt Lake | 2017* |
| 39 | Ken Ivory | Rep | Salt Lake | 2021* (2011–2019) |
| 40 | Andrew Stoddard | Dem | Salt Lake | 2019 |
| 41 | Gay Lynn Bennion | Dem | Salt Lake | 2021 |
| 42 | Robert M. Spendlove | Rep | Salt Lake | 2014* |
| 43 | Steve Eliason | Rep | Salt Lake | 2011 |
| 44 | Jordan D. Teuscher | Rep | Salt Lake | 2021 |
| 45 | Susan Pulsipher | Rep | Salt Lake | 2017 |
| 46 | Jeffrey D. Stenquist | Rep | Salt Lake | 2019 |
| 47 | Mark A. Strong | Rep | Salt Lake | 2019 |
| 48 | James F. Cobb | Rep | Salt Lake | 2023 |
| 49 | Candice P. Pierucci | Rep | Salt Lake | 2019* |
| 50 | Stephanie Gricius | Rep | Utah | 2023 |
| 51 | Jefferson Moss | Rep | Utah | 2017 |
| 52 | A. Cory Maloy | Rep | Utah | 2017 |
| 53 | Kay J. Christofferson | Rep | Utah | 2013 |
| 54 | Brady Brammer | Rep | Utah | 2019 |
| 55 | Jon Hawkins | Rep | Utah | 2019 |
| 56 | Val L. Peterson | Rep | Utah | 2011 |
| 57 | Nelson T. Abbott | Rep | Utah | 2021 |
| 58 | Keven J. Stratton | Rep | Utah | 2012* |
| 59 | Mike L. Kohler | Rep | Summit, Wasatch | 2021 |
| 60 | Tyler Clancy | Rep | Utah | 2023* |
| 61 | Marsha Judkins | Rep | Utah | 2018* |
| 62 | Norman K Thurston | Rep | Utah | 2015 |
| 63 | Stephen L. Whyte | Rep | Utah | 2021* |
| 64 | Jefferson S. Burton | Rep | Utah | 2021 |
| 65 | Douglas R. Welton | Rep | Utah | 2021 |
| 66 | Steven J. Lund | Rep | Juab, Sanpete | 2021 |
| 67 | Christine F. Watkins | Rep | Carbon, Duchesne, Emery, Grand | 2017 |
| 68 | Scott H. Chew | Rep | Duchesne, Uintah | 2015 |
| 69 | Phil Lyman | Rep | Emery, Garfield, Grand, Kane, San Juan, Wayne | 2019 |
| 70 | Carl R. Albrecht | Rep | Beaver, Iron, Piute, Sevier | 2017 |
| 71 | Rex Shipp | Rep | Iron | 2019 |
| 72 | Joseph Elison | Rep | Washington | 2023 |
| 73 | Colin W. Jack | Rep | Washington | 2022* |
| 74 | R. Neil Walter | Rep | Washington | 2023 |
| 75 | Walt Brooks | Rep | Washington | 2016* |

* Representative was originally appointed to office.
