= Cal Roberts =

Cal Roberts may refer to:

- Callum Roberts (footballer)
- Calvin Roberts (politician)

== See also ==
- Callum Roberts (disambiguation)
- Calvin Roberts (disambiguation)
