= Patrick Belmont =

American politician (born 1977)

Member-elect of the Utah House of Representatives from the 3rd district
- Assuming office January 2027
- Succeeding: Jason Thompson

Personal details
- Born: December 13, 1977 (age 48) Chicago, Illinois, U.S.
- Party: Democratic (fl. 2022)
- Scientific career
- Awards: Kirk Bryan Award (2018)
- Workplaces: Utah State University
- Thesis: Landscape Evolution and Aquatic Ecology: Long-term Sediment Dynamics and Landscape Influences in Stream Ecosystems (2007)
- Doctoral advisor: Frank Pazzaglia

Patrick Belmont (born December 13, 1977) is an American hydrologist and politician. He is the independent member-elect of the Utah House of Representatives from the 3rd district. A researcher of geomorphology and hydrology, he is also a professor at Utah State University.

== Biography ==
Belmont was born on December 13, 1977, in Chicago, the son of Dan and Patricia Belmont, and moved to Chesterfield, Missouri. After graduating from De Smet Jesuit High School in 1996, he studied at Texas Christian University, where he obtained a BS in molecular biology in 2000. He was a two-letter men's cross country athlete for the TCU Horned Frogs, and placed 55th during the 1999 south-central regional finals, short of qualifying for the national championships.

Belmont joined Lehigh University as a graduate student, obtaining an MS and PhD, both in earth and environmental sciences, in 2003 and 2007, respectively. His doctoral dissertation Landscape Evolution and Aquatic Ecology: Long-term Sediment Dynamics and Landscape Influences in Stream Ecosystems was supervised by Frank Pazzaglia.

Belmost later started working at Utah State University, where he is a professor. At USU, Belmont teaches courses in climate science, hydrology, and physical geography. He won the 2018 Kirk Bryan Award as co-author of "Landscape evolution, valley excavation, and terrace development following abrupt base-level fall", a Geological Society of America Bulletin article.

As an academic, Belmont researches geomorphology and hydrology. He contributed a chapter to Stream Restoration in Dynamic Fluvial Systems: Scientific Approaches, Analyses, and Tools (2011), the 194th volume of the Geophysical Monograph Series.

Belmont ran as the Democratic candidate for the 3rd district in the 2022 election; he lost to Dan Johnson 43.3% to 56.6%. He made a second run in the district in 2024, this time as an independent, but Jason Thompson won the seat 54.0% to 46.0%.

In the 2026 election, Belmont made another independent run for the same seat. Several news outlets received rivaling editor letters from Belmont and Thompson. He won the seat 58.1% to 41.9%, flipping the seat away from the Republicans. Charlie Schill of Cache Valley Daily stated that "the victory was “perhaps the most surprising outcome during local state level balloting on Nov. 3", attributing the victory to his prioritization of Great Salt Lake as an issue.
