= Chevrier (surname) =

Chevrier is a surname. Notable people with the surname include:

- Alain Chevrier, Canadian ice hockey goaltender
- Don Chevrier
- Edgar-Rodolphe-Eugène Chevrier
- Kristen Chevrier, American politician
- Lionel Chevrier
- Jean-François Chevrier
