= Jason Thompson (politician) =

American entrepreneur and politician

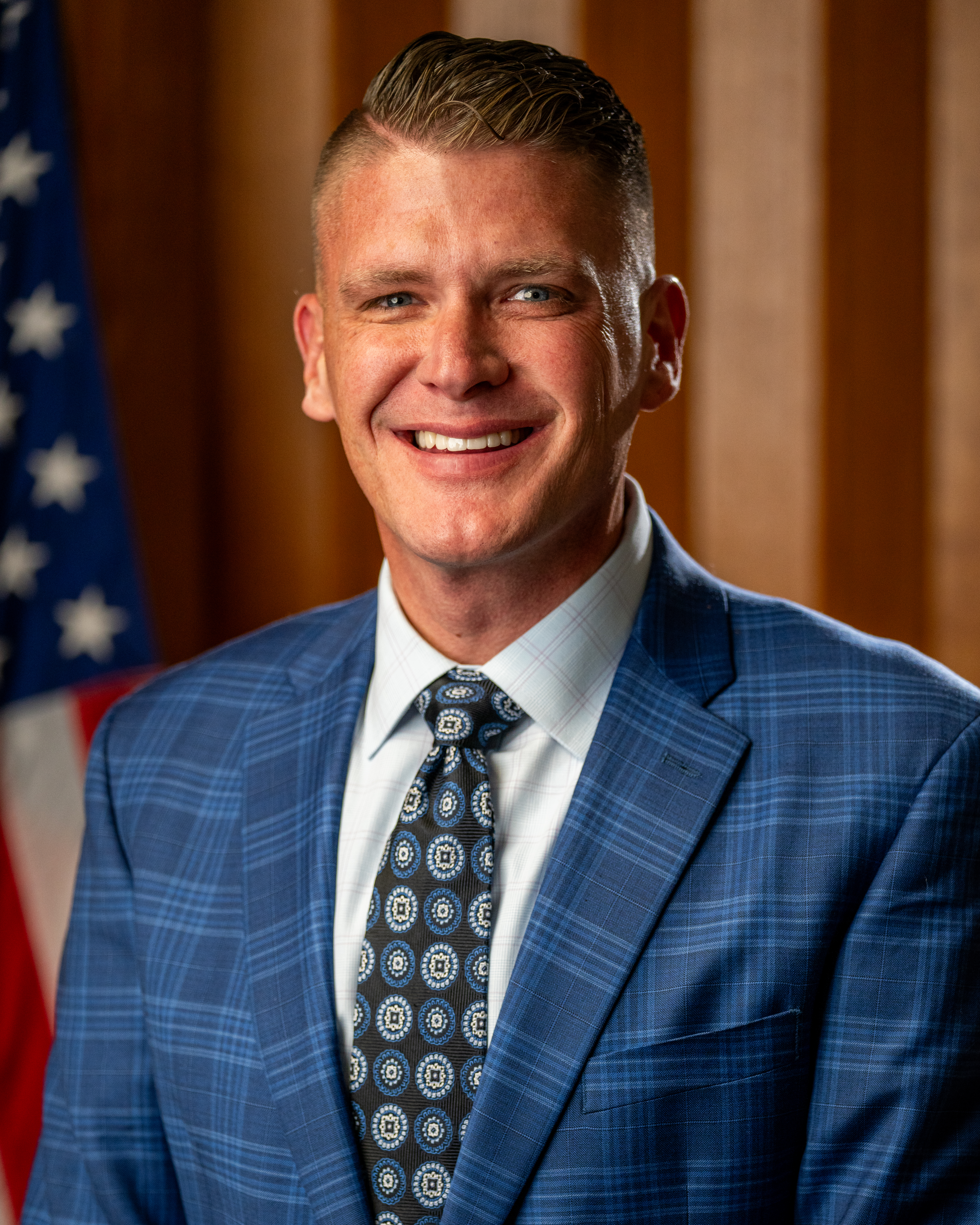
- Jason Thompson in 2023

Member of the Utah House of Representatives
- Incumbent
- Assumed office January 1, 2025
- Preceded by: Dan Johnson
- Constituency: 3rd District

Personal details
- Party: Republican
- Education: Brigham Young University (BA, MPA)

Jason Edward Thompson is an American entrepreneur and politician serving as a member of the Utah House of Representatives representing the 3rd district. Elected in November 2024, he assumed office on January 1, 2025. He is the former mayor of River Heights, Utah.

== Education ==
Thompson graduated with a bachelor's degree in History and Political Science from Brigham Young University and a Master of Public Administration from Brigham Young University.

== Career ==
Jason Thompson has started various businesses. In 2011, he co-founded Fox Pest Control, which grew to become the 14th largest pest control company in the U.S. before its acquisition by Rollins, Inc. in 2023. Thompson owns and operates several businesses in Cache Valley.

== Personal life ==
Thompson resides in River Heights, Utah, with his wife, Dana, and their six children. He is a member of The Church of Jesus Christ of Latter-day Saints.

== Electoral Record ==
2024 Utah House of Representatives election, District 3
| Party | Candidate | Votes | % |
|---|---|---|---|
| Republican | Jason Thompson | 8,209 | 54 |
| Unaffiliated | Patrick Belmont | 6,988 | 46 |
