= Marsha Judkins =

American politician

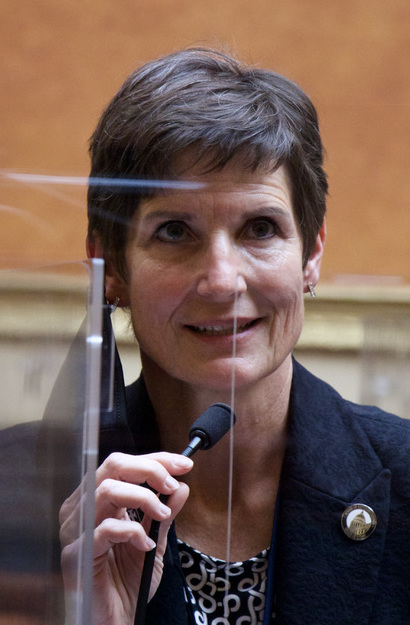

46th Mayor of Provo
- Incumbent
- Assumed office January 6, 2026
- Preceded by: Michelle Kaufusi

Member of the Utah House of Representatives from the 61st district
- In office July 2018 – December 31, 2024
- Preceded by: Keith Grover
- Succeeded by: Lisa Shepherd

Personal details
- Party: Republican

Marsha Judkins is an American politician serving as the 46th and current Mayor of Provo, Utah. Marsha served in the Utah House of Representatives, representing District 61. During the 2022 General Session, she served on the Social Services Appropriations Committee, House Health and Human Services Committee, and the House Law Enforcement and Criminal Justice Committee.

== Early life and career ==
Marsha and her husband Randy reside in Provo. Marsha Judkins graduated from Bingham High School in South Jordan. She went on to earn a B.A. in Political Science with a minor in Mathematics from Brigham Young University. Eventually, Judkins returned to BYU and earned a Masters in Public Administration. After graduating, she worked as a Children’s Librarian at the Provo City Library, and then began teaching math at a private college in Salt Lake City. She currently teaches part-time in the Developmental Math Department at UVU.

== Political career and elections ==
In 2012, Marsha was elected to the Provo City School Board and served for one term.

In June 2018, Keith Grover was appointed to fill a vacancy in the Utah Senate. This created a vacancy in the House. In July 2018, Judkins was appointed to fill out the rest of the term. She had already secured the party's nomination to run for the seat in the November 2018 general election by winning the primary with 60% of the vote. In the November 2018 general election, Judkins defeated Eric Chase of the United Utah Party with 78.72 percent of the popular vote. In the November 2022 general election, Judkins defeated opponent Michael Anderson with 76.21% of the popular vote.

== Notable legislation ==
- 2022- Marsha Judkins co-sponsored HB 11, which banned transgender school-aged girls from participating in school sports. The bill was vetoed by Governor Cox before being overridden by the legislature.
- 2022- Representative Judkins ran HB 113 which requires the State Board of Education to annually review standards and guidelines related to establishing disability classifications, permits disability program money to be used for facilities construction and alteration under certain circumstances, and amends a formula related to add-on weighted pupil units for students with disabilities.
- 2022- Judkins ran HB 138 which modifies the age that a minor housed in a detention facility awaiting trial is transferred to an adult jail, and requires a minor who is committed to prison by a district court be provisionally housed with the Division of Juvenile Justice Services until the minor is 25 years old.

== 2022 sponsored legislation ==
Bill	Status
HB 11- Student Eligibility In Interscholastic Activities	House override Governor's veto 3/25/22
HB 112- Animal Fighting Penalties	House/ filed 3/4/22
HB 113- Students with Disabilities Funding Revisions	House/ to Governor 3/10/22
HB 136- Motor Vehicle Insurance Revisions	House/ filed 3/4/22
HB 138- Juvenile Justice Modifications	House/ to Governor 3/10/22
HB 192- Former Offender Employment Amendments	House/ filed 3/4/22
HB 359- Eviction Records Amendments	House/ to Governor 3/10/2022
HB 459- HIV Testing Modifications	House/ filed 3/4/22
