= Jeff Stenquist =

American politician (born 1969)

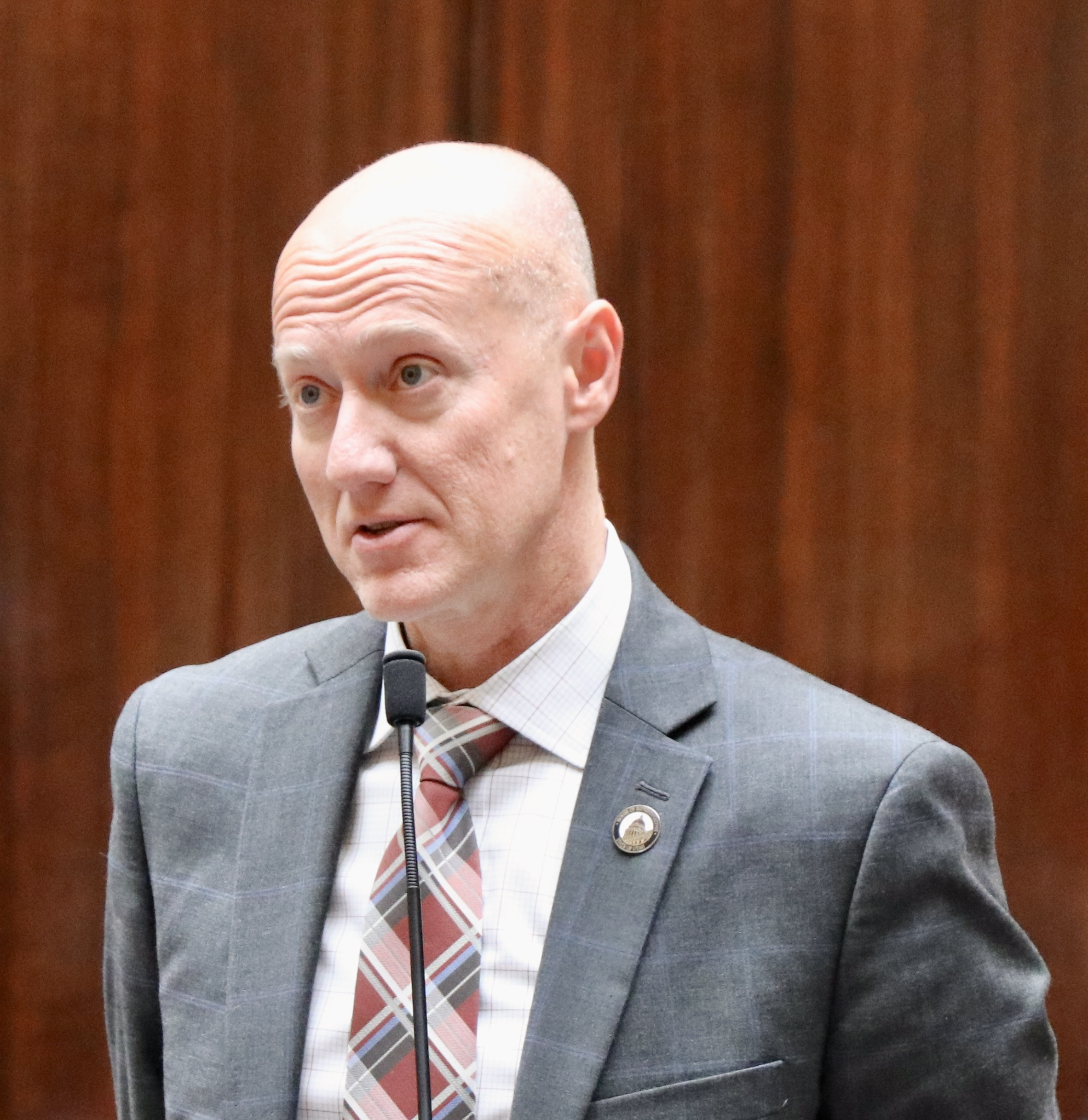

Member of the Utah House of Representatives
- In office January 1, 2019 – December 31, 2024
- Preceded by: Greg Hughes
- Succeeded by: Calvin Roberts
- Constituency: 51st district (2019–2023); 46th district (2023–2024)

Personal details
- Born: Jeffrey Stenquist; December 31, 1969 (age 56) Tremonton, Utah, U.S.
- Party: Republican
- Education: University of Utah (BS)

Jeffrey D. Stenquist (born December 31, 1969) is an American politician and software developer who served as a member of the Utah House of Representatives from the 46th district. Elected in November 2018, he assumed office on January 1, 2019.

== Education ==
Stenquist was born in Tremonton, Utah. He earned a Bachelor of Science degree in computer science from the University of Utah.

== Career ==
Since graduating from college, Stenquist has worked as a software engineer and software architect at Data2Logistics and O.C. Tanner. In 2004 and 2005, Stenquist was a member of the Draper City Planning Commission. From 2005 to 2017, Stenquist was a member of the Draper, Utah City Council. Stenquist was elected to the Utah House of Representatives in November 2018 and assumed office on January 1, 2019.

Stenquist ran for re-election in 2024 but was defeated in the Republican primary by Calvin Roberts.
