= Callum Roberts =

Callum Roberts is the name of:

- Callum Roberts (biologist), British biologist
- Callum Roberts (footballer) (born 1997), English footballer
