= Rosemary Lesser =

American politician

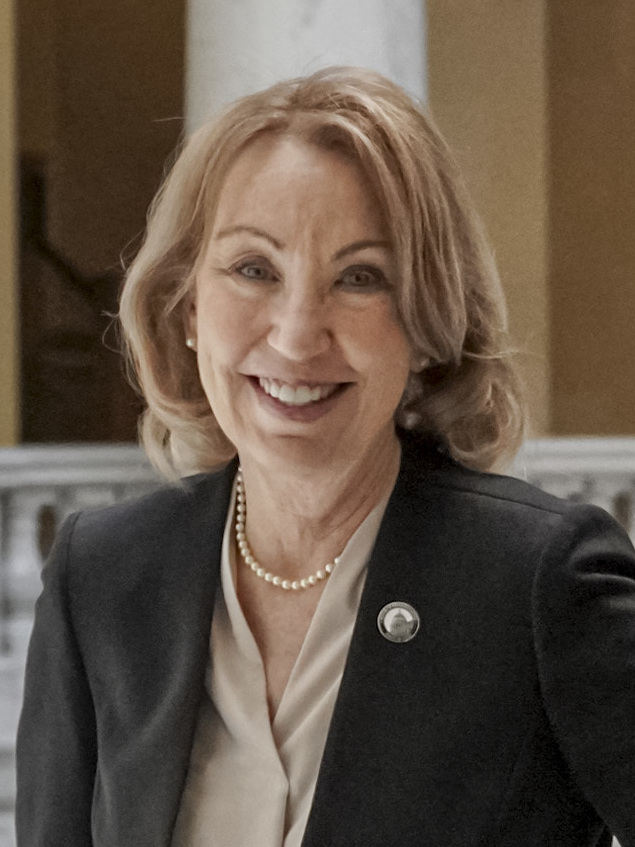

Member of the Utah House of Representatives from the 10th district
- In office January 16, 2021 – December 31, 2024
- Preceded by: LaWanna Shurtliff
- Succeeded by: Jill Koford

Personal details
- Party: Democratic
- Education: University of Notre Dame (BS); Uniformed Services University of the Health Sciences (MD)

Rosemary T. Lesser is an American physician, United States Air Force veteran, and Democratic politician who represented Utah House of Representatives District 10 from January 2021 until December 2024.

== Early life and education ==
Lesser was raised in an Air Force family and lived on multiple U.S. and European bases during childhood. She was a member of the first cohort of undergraduate women admitted to the University of Notre Dame, earning a B.S. in preprofessional studies in 1976. She received an M.D. from the Uniformed Services University of the Health Sciences in 1981.

== Military and medical career ==
After medical school, Lesser served around 15 years in the United States Air Force as an obstetrician-gynecologist, with duty assignments including Germany and Texas. She completed an OB/GYN residency at Wilford Hall USAF Medical Center in San Antonio, Texas.

After completing military service in 1992, she settled in Ogden, Utah, practicing at the Ogden Women’s Clinic and at Ogden Regional Medical Center and McKay-Dee Hospital until 2012; she later worked as an OB hospitalist, including at the Ogden Clinic. Lesser has also participated in medical volunteer work, including surgical outreach in Mali, West Africa, and emergency medical response following the 2010 Haiti earthquake. (Note: While numerous sources document extensive medical relief efforts in Haiti, specific rosters of individual volunteers are not always publicly listed.)

== Political career ==
Following the death of Rep. LaWanna “Lou” Shurtliff on December 30, 2020, Democratic delegates in House District 10 recommended Lesser for appointment; Governor Spencer Cox appointed her on January 16, 2021, and she took office during the 2021 general session.

In the 2022 general election she defeated Republican nominee Jill Koford with 52.3% of the vote (5,771 to 5,271). In 2024, Koford narrowly defeated Lesser in one of the state’s closest House races; canvassed county results certified Koford’s win and flipped the Weber County–based seat to Republicans.

Lesser served on several legislative committees, including the House Health & Human Services Committee and the House Political Subdivisions Committee. She was elected Democratic caucus manager in late 2022 and served in the caucus leadership during the 2023–2024 sessions.

Lesser’s priorities included expanding access to health care, eliminating the state sales tax on groceries, strengthening early childhood supports, and clean air and natural resource protection. Commentators frequently noted her uncommon status as a Democratic legislator from outside Salt Lake County.

== Personal life and community ==
Lesser and her husband, physician and Air Force veteran Dave Lesser, live in Ogden; they have six children and grandchildren. She has been involved with community organizations including the Boys & Girls Clubs of Weber–Davis, Onstage Ogden, the Olene S. Walker Institute of Politics & Public Service at Weber State University, and the Women in Business Committee of the Ogden–Weber Chamber of Commerce.

Her recognitions include the 2024 Community Leader of the Year award from United Way of Northern Utah and the 2025 ATHENA International Leadership Award from the Ogden–Weber Chamber of Commerce.
