= James F. Cobb =

American politician

Member of the Utah House of Representatives from the 48th district
- In office January 1, 2023 – December 31, 2024
- Succeeded by: Doug Fiefia

Personal details
- Party: Republican

James F. Cobb is an American politician. He served as a Republican member for the 48th district of the Utah House of Representatives.
