= Susan Pulsipher =

American politician

Member of the Utah House of Representatives
- In office January 1, 2017 – December 31, 2024
- Preceded by: Rich Cunningham
- Succeeded by: Tracy Miller
- Constituency: 50th district (2017–2023); 45th district (2023–2024)

Personal details
- Party: Republican

Susan Pulsipher is an American politician who served in the Utah House of Representatives, representing District 45.

== Early life and career ==
Pulsipher lives in South Jordan. She has a B.S. in education and an M.Ed. in Education Leadership with a Policy emphasis from Brigham Young University. She served on the Board of Education of the Jordan School District from 2011 through 2017.

== Political career ==
Pulsipher was elected to the Utah House in 2016, defeating Democrat Patty Rich. She was reelected in 2018, defeating Democratic opponent Megan Wiesen.

== Electoral Record ==
2022 Utah House of Representatives election, District 45
Party	Candidate	Votes	%
Republican	Susan Pulsipher	12,787	100
Total votes		12,787	100

2020 Utah House of Representatives election, District 50
Party	Candidate	Votes	%
Republican	Susan Pulsipher	19,125	71.5
Democratic	Emily Hayes	7,636	28.5
Total votes		26,761	100

2018 Utah House of Representatives election, District 50
Party	Candidate	Votes	%
Republican	Susan Pulsipher	14,312	69.6
Democratic	Megan Wiesen	6,264	30.4
Total votes		20,576	100

2016 Utah House of Representatives election, District 50
Party	Candidate	Votes	%
Republican	Susan Pulsipher	15,538	75.2
Democratic	Patty Rich	5,121	24.8
Total votes		20,659	100
