= Logan Monson =

American politician

Member of the Utah House of Representatives from the 69th district
- Incumbent
- Assumed office January 1, 2025
- Preceded by: Phil Lyman

Personal details
- Born: Provo, Utah, U.S.
- Party: Republican
- Education: Utah State University
- Website: www.votemonson.com

Logan James Monson is an American politician. He serves as a Republican member for the 69th district in the Utah House of Representatives since 2025. In the 2024 election he defeated Democrat candidate Davina Smith. Monson was previously a member of the city council and mayor of Blanding in San Juan County.

== Electoral Record ==
2024 Utah House of Representatives election, District 69
Party	Candidate	Votes	%
Republican	Logan Monson	13,246	62.5
Democratic	Davina Smith	7,963	37.5
Total votes		21,209	100
