= Kristen Chevrier =

American politician

Member of the Utah House of Representatives from the 54th district
- Incumbent
- Assumed office January 1, 2025
- Preceded by: Brady Brammer

Personal details
- Party: Republican
- Website: www.kristenforutah.com

Kristen Chevrier is an American politician. She serves as a Republican member for the 54th district in the Utah House of Representatives since 2025.

Chevrier is a long-time political activist and member of local Republican Party leadership from the city of Highland.

In February 2025, she sponsored HB403, which prohibits food stamps from being used to purchase candy and soft drinks.
