= Nicholeen P. Peck =

American politician (born 1975)

Member of the Utah House of Representatives from the 28th district
- Incumbent
- Assumed office January 1, 2025
- Preceded by: Tim Jimenez

Personal details
- Born: 29 March 1975 (age 51) Salt Lake City, Utah
- Party: Republican
- Spouse: Spencer Peck (m. 1993)
- Children: 4
- Profession: Author, tutor
- Website: peck4utah.com

Nicholeen P. Peck is an American politician. She serves as a Republican member for the 28th district in the Utah House of Representatives since 2025.

Peck is a Mormon author and appeared on The World's Strictest Parents in 2009.

In the state house, Peck introduced legislation that would block public funds from being used for gender-transition treatments and procedures.

Peck formerly lived in Tooele, Utah.

== Electoral Record ==
2024 Utah House of Representatives election, District 28
Party	Candidate	Votes	%
Republican	Nicholeen Peck	11,863	68.9
Democratic	Fred Baker	5,344	31.1
Total votes		17,207	100
