= Bridger Bolinder =

American politician

Member of the Utah House of Representatives from the 29th district
- Incumbent
- Assumed office January 1, 2023
- Preceded by: Matthew Gwynn (redistricting)
- Succeeded by: Sheldon Birch (elect)

Personal details
- Party: Republican

Bridger Bolinder is an American politician. He serves as a Republican member for the 29th district of the Utah House of Representatives.
