= David Shallenberger =

American politician

Member of the Utah House of Representatives from the 58th district
- Incumbent
- Assumed office January 1, 2025
- Preceded by: Keven Stratton

Personal details
- Party: Republican
- Education: Brigham Young University; Willamette University
- Website: www.david4utah.com

David Shallenberger is an American politician. He serves as a Republican member for the 58th district in the Utah House of Representatives since 2025. In the 2024 election he was elected defeating Democratic candidate Joshua Sorenson. He earned his undergraduate degree at Brigham Young University and a law degree at Willamette University College of Law in Salem, Oregon.
