= Rosalba Dominguez =

American politician

Member of the Utah House of Representatives from the 35th district
- Incumbent
- Assumed office January 1, 2025
- Preceded by: Mark Wheatley

Personal details
- Party: Democratic
- Website: www.voterosalba.com

Rosalba Dominguez is an American politician. She serves as a Democratic member for the 35th district in the Utah House of Representatives since 2025.

Dominguez is a first-generation Mexican-American. She was a member of Murray city council.

== Electoral Record ==
Utah's 35th House District General Election, 2024
Party	Candidate	Votes	%
Democratic	Rosalba Dominguez	9,139	52%
Republican	Mike Bird	8,451	48%
Total votes		17,590	100%
