= Troy Shelley =

American politician

Member of the Utah House of Representatives from the 66th district
- Incumbent
- Assumed office January 1, 2025
- Preceded by: Steven Lund

Personal details
- Party: Republican
- Website: www.utahhouse.org

Troy Shelley is an American politician. He serves as a Republican member for the 66th district in the Utah House of Representatives since 2025. In the 2024 election he was elected unopposed after winning the Republican primary. Shelley was previously chair of the Sanpete County Republican Party.
