= Lisa Shepherd =

American politician

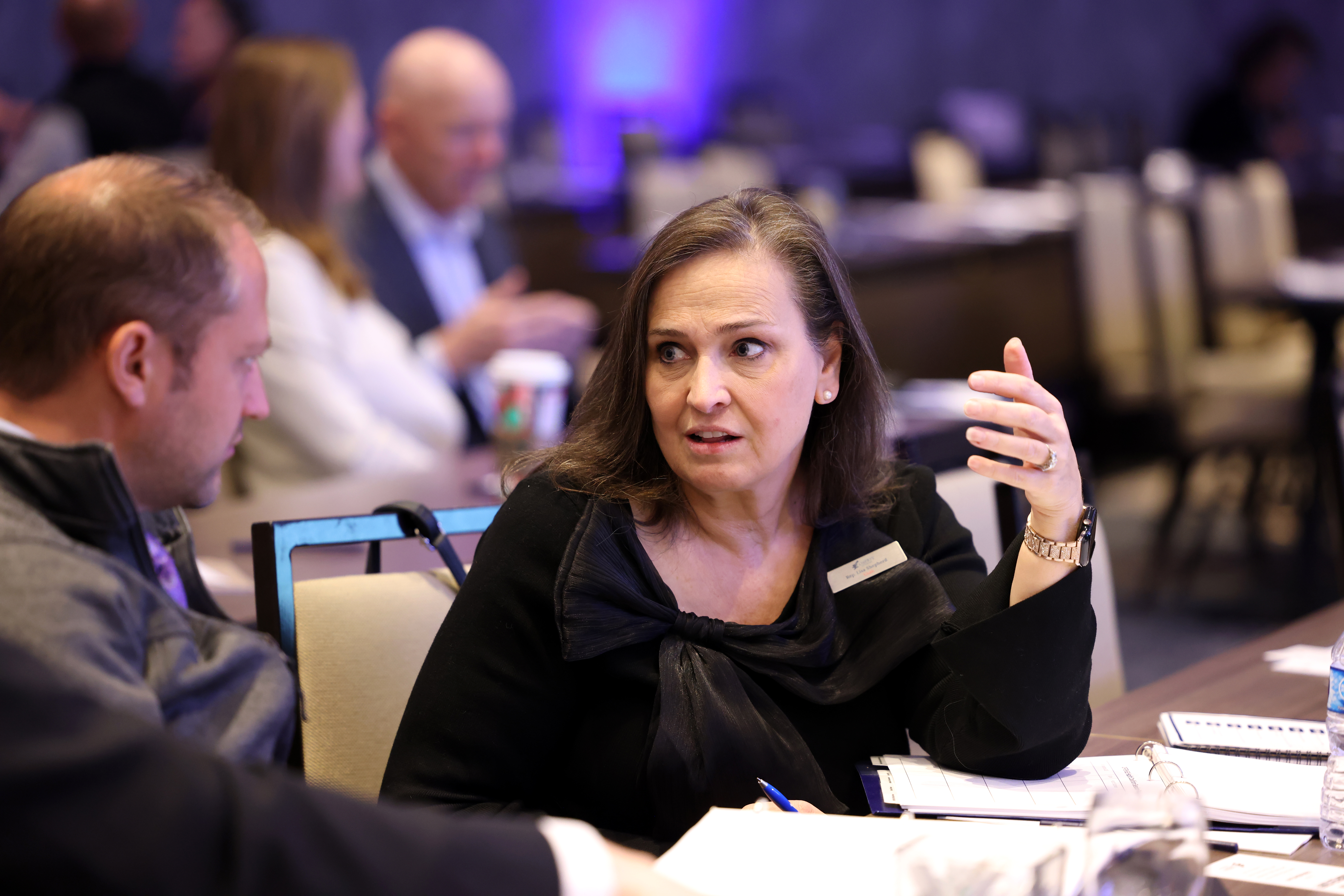

Member of the Utah House of Representatives from the 61st district
- Incumbent
- Assumed office January 1, 2025
- Preceded by: Marsha Judkins

Personal details
- Party: Republican
- Website: lisa61.com

Lisa Shepherd is an American politician. She serves as a Republican member for the 61st district in the Utah House of Representatives since 2025.
