= Tracy Miller (politician) =

American politician

Member of the Utah House of Representatives from the 45th district
- Incumbent
- Assumed office January 1, 2025
- Preceded by: Susan Pulsipher

Personal details
- Born: California
- Party: Republican
- Education: Utah State University; Brigham Young University
- Website: www.tracyforutah.com

Tracy Miller is an American politician. She serves as a Republican member for the 45th district in the Utah House of Representatives since 2025.

== Electoral Record ==
2024 Utah House of Representatives election, District 45
Party	Candidate	Votes	%
Republican	Tracy Miller	13,930	67
Democratic	Sara Cimmers	6,871	33
Total votes		20,801	100
