= Mike Kohler =

Utah politician

Member of the Utah House of Representatives
- Incumbent
- Assumed office January 1, 2021
- Preceded by: Tim Quinn
- Constituency: 54th district (2021–2023); 59th district (2023–present)

Personal details
- Born: Midway, Utah, U.S.
- Party: Republican
- Children: 6

Mike L. Kohler is an American politician serving as a member of the Utah House of Representatives from the 59th district. Elected in November 2020, he assumed office on January 1, 2021.

== Early life and education ==
Kohler was born and raised in Midway, Utah. He studied agricultural economics and dairy science at Utah State University before returning home to his family's farm. Kohler later studied economics at the University of Utah.

== Career ==
Kohler operated a farm before selling his ownership share to family members. He has since managed the Midway Irrigation Company. He was also a member of the Wasatch County Commission. Kohler was elected to the Utah House of Representatives in November 2020 and assumed office on January 1, 2021.
