= Matt MacPherson =

American politician

Member of the Utah House of Representatives from the 26th district
- Incumbent
- Assumed office October 10, 2023
- Preceded by: Quinn Kotter
- Succeeded by: Michael Finch (elect)

Personal details
- Party: Republican

Matt MacPherson is an American politician. He serves as a Republican member for the 26th district of the Utah House of Representatives.
