= Stewart Barlow =

American politician

Stewart E. Barlow

Member of the Utah House of Representatives from the 17th district
- Incumbent
- Assumed office September 1, 2011
- Preceded by: Julie Fisher
- Succeeded by: Lili Bitner (elect)

Personal details
- Party: Republican
- Education: University of Utah (BS); Georgetown University School of Medicine (MD)
- Profession: Physician
- Website: votedrbarlow.com

Stewart E. Barlow is an American politician and a Republican member of the Utah House of Representatives representing District 17 since his September 1, 2011, appointment to fill the vacancy created by the resignation of Julie Fisher.

== Early life and career ==
Barlow earned his BS in psychology from the University of Utah and his MD from the Georgetown University School of Medicine. He currently works as a physician and surgeon in Ogden specializing in Otolaryngology and lives in Fruit Heights, Utah with his wife Marie and six children.

== Political career ==
- In 2014, Barlow won the 2014 general election with 6,973 votes (77.6%) against Democratic nominee Eric Last.
- In 2012, Barlow was unopposed for the June 26, 2012 Republican primary and won the November 6, 2012 general election with 11,205 votes (70.7%) against Democratic nominee Bonnie Peterson Flint.

Rep. Barlow currently serves on the House Health and Human Services Committee, House Revenue and Taxation Committee, Natural Resources, Agriculture, and Environmental Quality Appropriations Subcommittee.

2022 legislation
Bill	Status
HB0005 Natural Resources, Agriculture, and Environmental Quality Base Budget	signed by the Governor 2/2/22
HB0041 County Property Tax Statement Amendments	signed by the Governor 3/15/22
HB0250 Environmental Quality Revenue Amendments	signed by the Governor 3/24/22
HB0306 Cosmetic Sale Amendments	sent to House filing for bills not passed 3/4/22
HB0400 Associate Physician License Amendments	signed by the Governor 3/24/22
HB0480 Educational Psychologist Amendments	sent to House filing for bills not passed 3/4/22

Barlow also floor sponsored SB0140S01 Home and Community Based Services Amendments.
