= Colin W. Jack =

American politician

Member of the Utah House of Representatives from the 73rd district
- In office July 2022 – January 1, 2023
- Preceded by: Travis Seegmiller

Member of the Utah House of Representatives from the 73rd district
- Incumbent
- Assumed office January 1, 2023

Personal details
- Party: Republican

Colin W. Jack is an American politician. He serves as a Republican member for the 73rd district of the Utah House of Representatives.
