= Calvin Roberts (politician) =

American politician

Member of the Utah House of Representatives from the 46th district
- Incumbent
- Assumed office January 1, 2025
- Preceded by: Jeff Stenquist

Personal details
- Party: Republican
- Education: Brigham Young University
- Website: www.votecalroberts.com

Calvin (Cal) Roberts is an American politician. He serves as a Republican member for the 46th district in the Utah House of Representatives since 2025.
