= Dan Johnson (Utah politician) =

American politician

Member of the Utah House of Representatives
- In office January 1, 2019 – December 31, 2024
- Preceded by: Edward Redd
- Succeeded by: Jason E. Thompson
- Constituency: 4th district (2019–2023); 3rd district (2023–2024)

Personal details
- Party: Republican
- Spouse: Carol
- Children: 7
- Education: Peru State College (BS); University of Nebraska Omaha (MS); Argosy University (EdD); University of Nebraska–Lincoln (EdS)

Dan N. Johnson is an American politician and retired educator who served as a member of the Utah House of Representatives from 2019 to 2024, representing 3rd and 4th districts.

== Education ==
Johnson earned a Bachelor of Science degree in education from Peru State College, a Master of Science in secondary education from the University of Nebraska Omaha, an EdD in educational leadership from Argosy University, and an EdS in educational administration from University of Nebraska–Lincoln.

== Career ==
Prior to entering politics, Johnson served as assistant superintendent of the Tooele County School District. Since 2011, he has been the director of Edith Bowen Laboratory School in Utah State University. He was elected to the Utah House of Representatives in November 2020 and assumed office on January 2, 2019. Johnson served as an educator for over 49 years, and for 42 of those years he was an administrator. In March 2020, Johnson authored a bill to make school lunches for low-income students more affordable.

Johnson announced his retirement in 2024 and did not seek re-election that year. He sat on the Public Education Appropriations Subcommittee, House Education Committee, and House Transportation Committee in his final term.
