= Thomas Peterson (politician) =

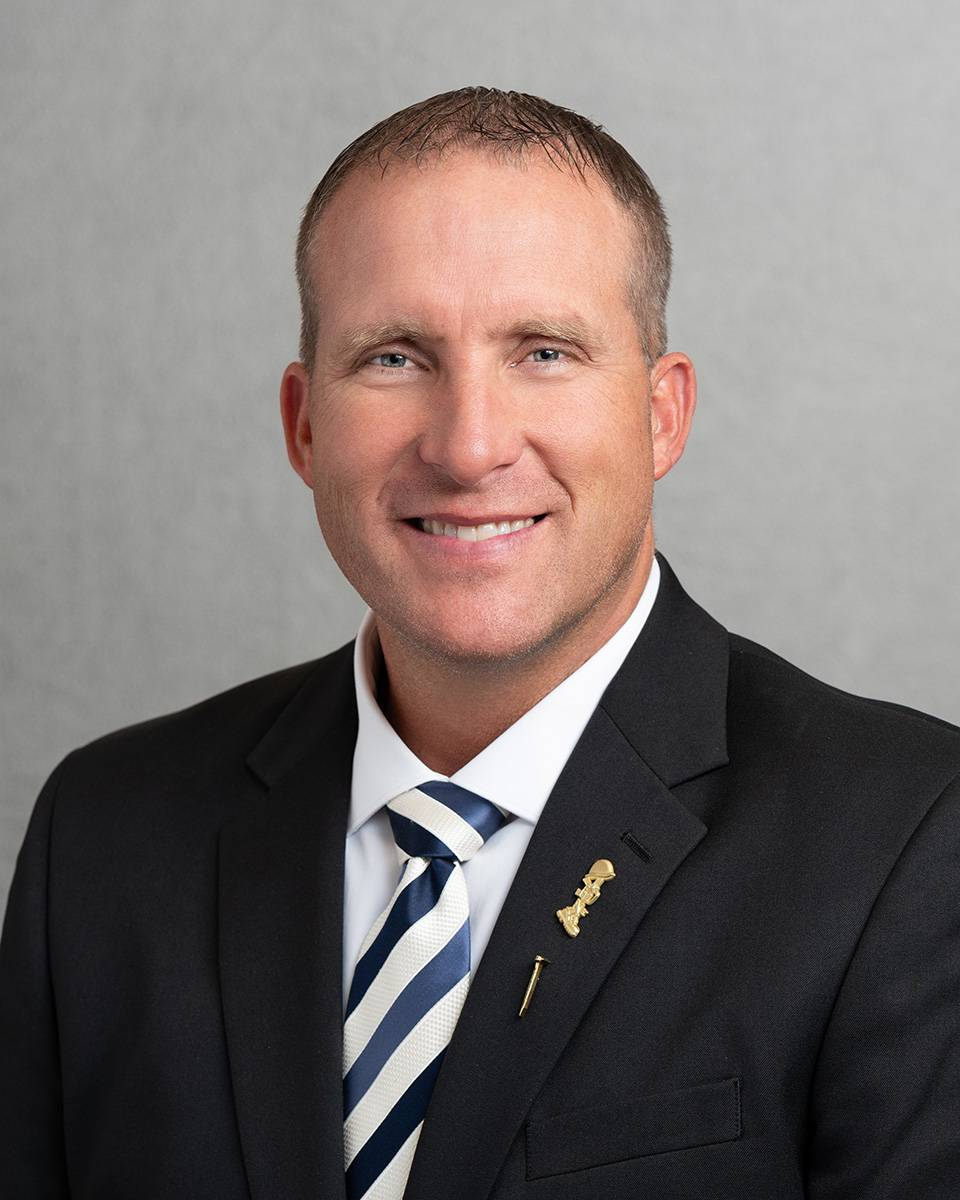

Member of the Utah House of Representatives from the 1st District
- Incumbent
- Assumed office September 21, 2022
- Preceded by: Joel Ferry

Personal details
- Born: Brigham City, Utah, U.S.
- Party: Republican
- Spouse: Jodi
- Children: 4
- Occupation: State building official; electrician; contractor
- Committees: House Public Utilities and Energy Committee, vice chair; Economic and Community Development Appropriations Subcommittee, vice chair; Legislative Water Development Commission, House chair
- Website: house.utleg.gov/rep/PETERT/

Thomas Peterson is an American politician and a member of the Utah House of Representatives from District 1. He replaced Joel Ferry after Utah Governor Spencer Cox appointed him to a state agency.

== Early life and education ==
Peterson was born in Brigham City, Utah, and grew up in nearby Perry. He graduated from Box Elder High School and later served a mission for The Church of Jesus Christ of Latter-day Saints in the South Africa Cape Town Mission. After returning, he trained and worked as an electrician and later operated a contracting business.

== Career ==
From the mid-2000s, Peterson worked in local government roles in Brigham City and Box Elder County related to operations and building services. He was elected to the Brigham City Council in 2013 and 2017, serving from January 2014 through December 2021, and resigned his council seat in January 2023 after joining the Utah House of Representatives.

In state service, Peterson was hired in late 2015 as an assistant state building official with Utah’s Division of Facilities Construction and Management (DFCM) and, in 2019, became a state building official.

== Utah House of Representatives ==
Peterson was selected by local Republican delegates and sworn in on September 21, 2022, to fill the District 1 seat vacated by Joel Ferry’s appointment to lead the Utah Department of Natural Resources. According to the House page, District 1 includes parts of Box Elder and Cache counties, and Peterson began legislative service on September 21, 2022.

For the 2024–2025 period, Peterson has served as vice chair of the House Public Utilities and Energy Committee and vice chair of the Economic and Community Development Appropriations Subcommittee. He is also the House chair of the Legislative Water Development Commission.

== Legislative priorities ==
Peterson’s sponsored legislation has centered on construction and inspection standards, utilities and energy policy, water development and infrastructure, and disaster preparedness. Selected measures include:

- H.B. 518 (2024) State Construction Code Modifications updating Utah’s adoption of model construction and energy codes.
- H.B. 58 (2025) Building Inspector Amendments directing the Uniform Building Code Commission to collect inspector data and recommend standards related to local inspection capacity.
- H.B. 313 (2025) Construction Industry Amendments aligning state code references with newer ICC and NFPA standards, including the 2023 National Electrical Code.
- H.B. 32 (2025) Borgstrom Brothers Memorial Highway Designation naming a portion of SR-102 in Box Elder County in honor of five brothers who died while serving in World War II.

== Electoral Record ==
2024 Utah House of Representatives election, District 1
Party	Candidate	Votes	%
Republican	Thomas Peterson	17,308	82.4
Democratic	Claudia Bigler	3,707	17.6
Total votes		21,015	100

2022 Utah House of Representatives election, District 1
Party	Candidate	Votes	%
Republican	Joel Ferry	11,781	82.1
Democratic	Joshua Hardy	2,379	16.6
Write-In	Thomas Peterson	128	0.9
Write-In	Ben Ferry	40	0.3
Write-In	Karson Riser	17	0.1
Total votes		13,345	100
