= Ryan Wilcox =

American politician

Ryan D. Wilcox
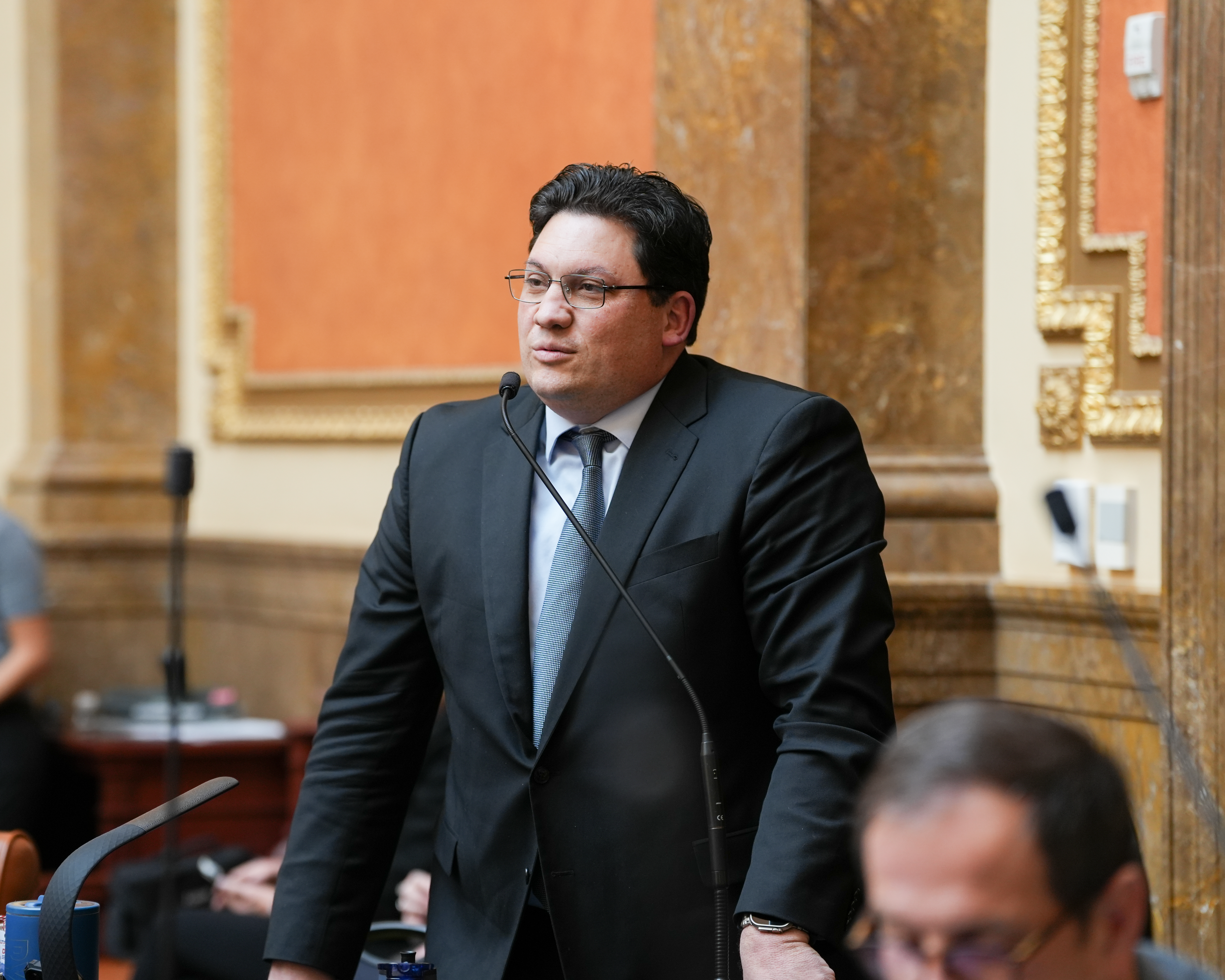

Member of the Utah House of Representatives from the 7th District
- In office January 1, 2021 – incumbent
- Preceded by: Kyle Andersen
- In office January 1, 2009 – June 2014
- Preceded by: Glenn A. Donnelson
- Succeeded by: Justin Fawson

Personal details
- Party: Republican
- Education: Weber State University (BA)
- Profession: Government Relations Professional

Ryan D. Wilcox is an American politician who serves as a Representative in the Utah House of Representatives for District 7. Recently re-elected to the position in 2021, he previously held the same seat from 2009 to 2014.

== Political career ==
Wilcox has supported 2nd amendment protections cosponsoring HB 357, which strengthens Second Amendment rights regardless of conceal-carry status. He also sponsored HB 134, which helps facilitate the transfer of firearms that have federally mandated requirements to be transferred. Additionally, Wilcox has worked to protect 4th amendment rights sponsoring HB 128 which protects personal electronic devices from searches without a proper warrant. Wilcox is also an advocate for knife rights, sponsoring HB 271 which restricts political subdivisions from issuing knife restrictions unless specifically authorized to do so. He has also received a great deal of press coverage for the opinion that certain changes need to be made to the Utah alcohol laws. He has run legislation that required improvements on the availability of reports brought from the Alcohol Abuse Tracking Committee to legislators so that it might be used more effectively.

During 2014, Wilcox served as Chair of the House Revenue and Taxation Committee and on the Business, Economic Development, and Labor Appropriations Subcommittee, The Commission on Federalism, The House Natural Resources and Environment Committee, and the Utah Tax Review Commission as well as several interim committees.

In the 2025 General Session Representative Wilcox serves as the Chair of the Law Enforcement and Criminal Justice Committee and as a member of the House Rules Committee, the Higher Education Appropriations Subcommittee, the House Business, Labor, and Commerce Committee, the Legislative Process Committee, and the School Security Task Force.

In national politics Representative Wilcox has continuously supported the ratification of the Comprehensive Nuclear-Test-Ban Treaty working with the congressional delegation from Utah and traveling to Washington to lobby for the effort.

== Family and personal life ==
Wilcox was born and raised in Ogden, Utah and is a lifetime resident of Weber County. In 1999, married Kristina Beckstrom, in the Latter-day Saint Bountiful Utah Temple. He is the father of five children.

Wilcox graduated from Weber State University with a BA in Commercial Spanish and Political Science. For many years he worked for Sprint Nextel Corporation managing retail stores. Under his leadership, stores won several awards for sales performance and operational excellence.

== Sponsored Legislation ==
2024 Session

- HB0014: School Threat Penalty Amendments
- HB0067S01: First Responder Mental Health Services Grant Program Amendments
- HB0069S05: DUI Testing Amendments
- HB0084S05: School Safety Amendments
- HB0086S02: Public Safety Data Amendments
- HB0142S01: Railroad Drone Amendments
- HB0176: Elected Official Vacancy Amendments
- HB0369: Defensive Force Amendments
- HB0372: Legislative Committee Staff Requirements
- HB0378S01: First Responder Mental Health Services Amendments
- HB0469S02: Department of Natural Resources Law Enforcement Amendments
- HB0490: Elections Office
- HB0493: Concurrent Enrollment Participation Amendments
- HB0508: Occupational Licensing Amendments
- HB0553: Reverse-keyword Information Prohibition
- HB0562S02: Utah Fairpark Area Investment and Restoration District

2023 Session

- HB0057S01: Law Enforcement Investigation Amendments
- HB0059S03: First Responder Mental Health Amendments
- HB0061S04: School Safety Requirements
- HB0062S01: Driving Under the Influence Modifications
- HB0225S01: Firearm Possession Amendments
- HB0266: Amber Alert Amendments
- HB0278: First Responder Mental Health Services Grant Program
- HB0330S01: Civil Commitment Amendments
- HB0335S02: Alternative Concurrent Enrollment Options for Capacity Flexibility
- HB0362: Criminal Justice Data Management Task Force Sunset Extension
- HB0383S01: Indigent Defense Amendments
- HB0439: Railroad Drone Amendments
- HB0450S01: Landscaping Requirements
- HB0457: State Property Transfer Amendments
- HB0474: Paratransit Services Amendments
- HB0486: Joinder of Criminal Offenses
- HB0492: Abuse of Personal Identity Act Amendments
- HB0506: Government Entity Compliance Amendments
- HB0518S03: Human Trafficking Prevention Program
- HB0523: Egg Retailer Amendments
- HB0528: Utah Energy Act Amendments
- HB0556: Legislative Committee Staff Requirements
- HJR016: Joint Resolution to Review Railroad Authority
- HR0002S01: House Rules Resolution - Public Comment Amendments

2022 Session

- HB0023S02: First Responder Mental Health Services Amendments
- HB0038: Catalytic Converter Amendments
- HB0038S01: Property Theft Amendments
- HB0171S02: Custodial Interrogation Amendments
- HB0259: Law Enforcement Use of Unmanned Aircraft
- HB0282S01: Water Wise Landscaping Amendments
- HB0293: Ground Ambulance Interfacility Transport Licensing
- HB0345S01: Public Safety Employee Personal Data Amendments
- HB0370: Mental Health Professional Amendments
- HB0399: Government Record Amendments
- HB0403S02: Justice Reinvestment Initiative Modifications
- HB0460: State Employee Retirement Amendments
- HB0491: Law Enforcement Court Order Reporting Amendments

2021 Session

- HB0058S01: Riot Amendments
- HB0251S01: Electronic Location Amendments
- HB0252S01: State Pay Plan Amendments
- HB0291S01: Residential Picketing Prohibition

2014 Session

- HB0031: Pollution Control Amendments
- HB0128S01: Electronic Device Location Amendments
- HB0209: Extension of Sales and Use Tax Exemption
- HB0217: Service Animals
- HB0306: Licensure Modifications
- HB0373S01: Firearm Transfer Certification Amendments
- HB0376: Alcohol Revisions
- HB0379: Proposed Tax Increase and Bond Proposition Amendments
- HB0379S03: Transparency of Ballot Propositions
- HB0430: Revisions to Tax

2013 Session

- HB0106S03: Medicaid Inspector General Amendments
- HB0215: Water Quality Amendments
- HB0216: Wasting Wildlife Amendments
- HB0228S04: Alcoholic Beverage Control Act Amendments
- HB0336S01: Amendments to Economic Development
- HB0360: Water and Irrigation Revisions

2012 Session

- HB0088: Custody Amendments
- HB0159S01: Unlawful Detention Amendments
- HB0354S02: Alcoholic Beverage Amendments
- HB0427: Tax Law Modifications
- HB0485S01: Change Application Amendments
- HB0500: Education Reporting Efficiency Amendments

2011 Session

- HB0040S01: Bonding Requirements for Government Officers and Employees
- HB0114: Utah Time Standardization Act
- HB0159: Operational Amendments
- HB0160: Efficiency Amendments
- HB0175: Condominium Ownership Act Modifications
- HB0271: Restrictions on Political Subdivisions Regarding the Regulation of Knives

2010 Session

- HB0053S01: Foreclosure Rescue and Loan Modification Amendments
- HB0098: State Engineer Bonding Requirements

2009 Session

- HB0182: Revisions to Government Law
- HB0295: Money Laundering Amendments
- HB0375: Local Government Records Amendments
