= Stephen L. Whyte =

American politician

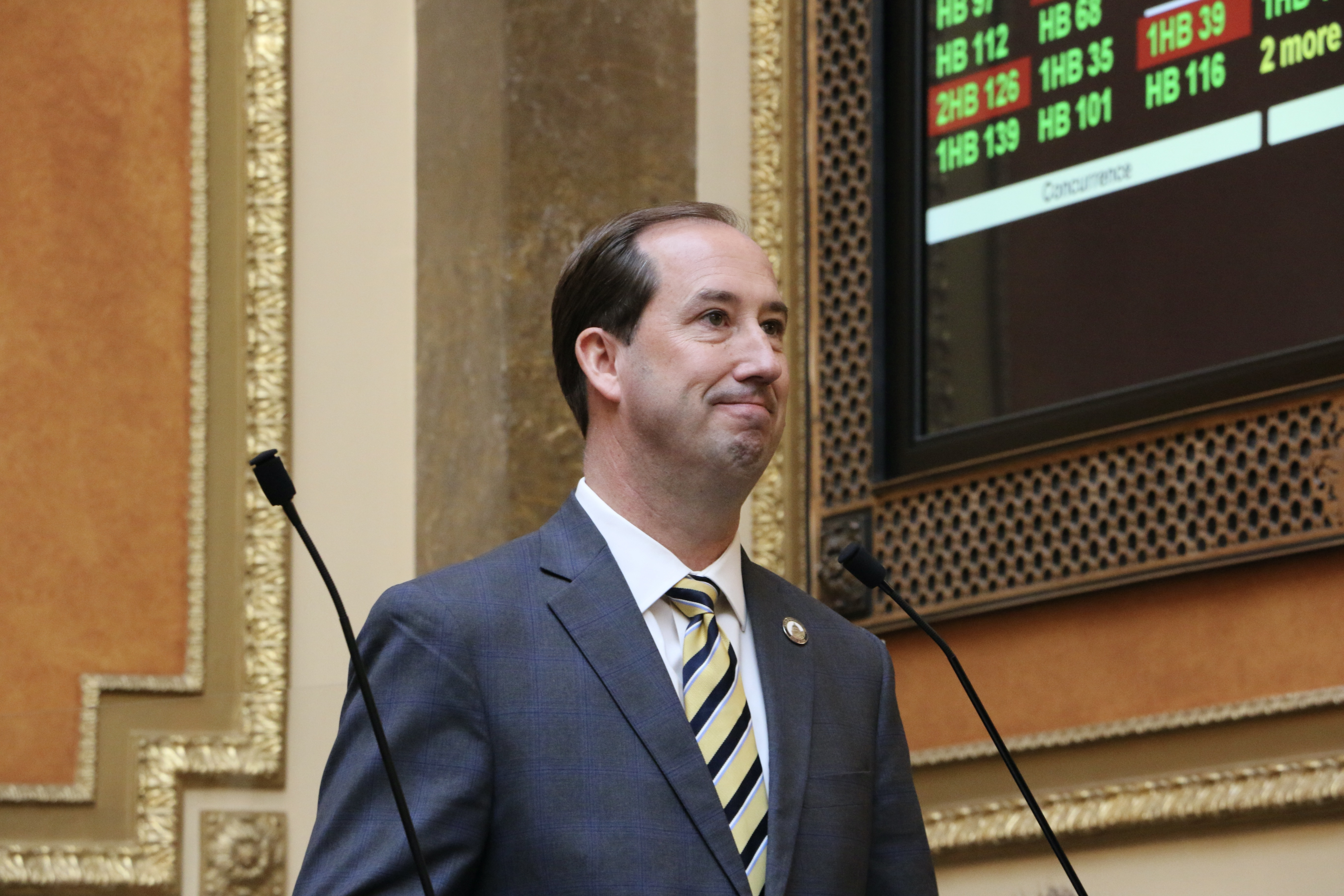

Member of the Utah House of Representatives from the 65th district
- In office November 6, 2021 – January 1, 2023
- Preceded by: Francis Gibson

Member of the Utah House of Representatives from the 63rd district
- Incumbent
- Assumed office January 1, 2023

Personal details
- Party: Republican

Stephen L. Whyte is an American politician. He serves as a Republican member for the 63rd district of the Utah House of Representatives.
