= Ashlee Matthews =

American Democratic politician from Utah

Member of the Utah House of Representatives
- Incumbent
- Assumed office January 1, 2021
- Preceded by: Eric Hutchings
- Constituency: 38th district (2021–2023); 37th district (2023–present)

Personal details
- Born: West Valley City, UT
- Party: Democratic
- Children: 2
- Website: http://www.ashleeforutah.com/

Ashlee Matthews is an American politician, a Democrat, she is a member of the Utah House of Representatives representing District 37.

Matthews was the leading vote getter in November 2020, over incumbent Eric Hutchings who had held the position for 18 years. Matthews received 6,114 votes to Hutchings' 5,733. Hutchings had received only 118 more votes than his opponent in 2018.

Matthews, who has worked in the construction department of the Utah Department of Transportation since 2011, ran on a platform to support working-class families, including affordable day care, better public transportation and livable wages. She is a supporter of congressional term limits.

During the 2022 General Session, Matthews served on the Business, Economic Development, and Labor Appropriations Subcommittee, House Business and Labor Committee, House Transportation Committee, and the Occupational and Professional Licensure Review Committee

== Personal life ==
Matthews was born in West Valley City, Utah. She is married, her husband is a union pipe fitter, and they have two children.
