= Paul A. Cutler =

American politician

Member of the Utah House of Representatives from the 18th district
- Incumbent
- Assumed office January 1, 2023

Personal details
- Born: London, England
- Party: Republican

Paul A. Cutler is an American politician. He serves as a Republican member for the 18th district of the Utah House of Representatives.
