= Doug Welton =

American politician

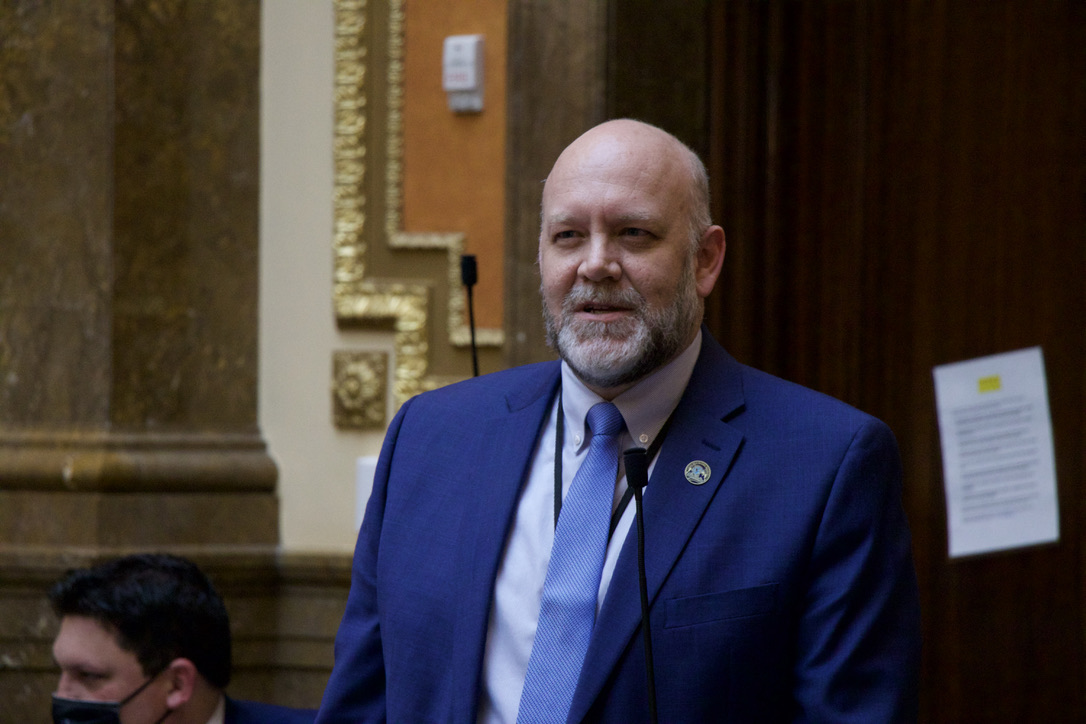
- Douglas Welton

Member of the Utah House of Representatives
- Incumbent
- Assumed office January 1, 2021
- Preceded by: Marc Roberts
- Constituency: 67th district (2021–2023); 65th district (2023–present)

Personal details
- Party: Republican
- Spouse: Kerri Welton
- Education: Utah Valley State College (BS); Southern Utah University (MS)

Douglas R. Welton is an American politician from Utah. He currently serves as the representative for Utah House District 65. He is on the Higher Education Appropriations Subcommittee, House Government Operations Committee, and the House Public Utilities, Energy, and Technology Committee.

== 2022 sponsored legislation ==
Bill	Status
HB 22- Open and Public Meetings Act Modifications	House/ to Governor 3/10/22
HB 106- Tax Sale Notice Amendments	Governor signed 2/22/22
HB 264- Municipal Alternate Voting Methods Amendments	House/ to Governor 3/14/22
HB 316- Medical Assistant Amendments	House/ to Governor 3/10/22
HB 347- Property Tax Exemption Amendments	House/ to Governor 3/10/22
HB 376- Municipal Office Amendments	House/ filed 3/4/22
HB 386- Education Innovation Program	House/ to Governor 3/14/22
HB 394- Recycling Transparency Amendments	House/ to Governor 3/14/22
HJR 20- Joint Resolution Designating National Speech and Debate Education Day	House/ filed 3/4/22
