= Nelson Abbott =

American attorney and politician

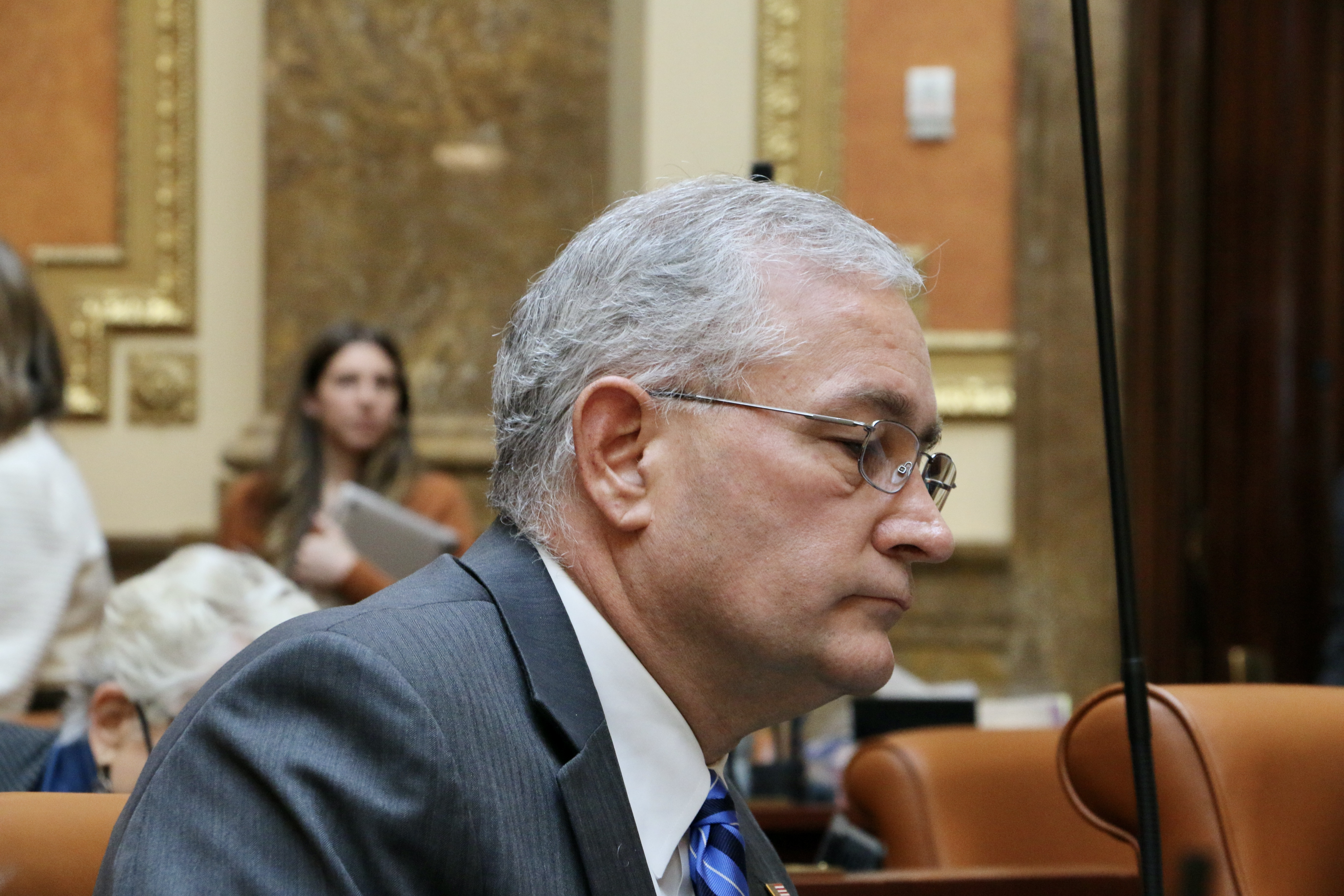
- Nelson Abbott

Member of the Utah House of Representatives
- Incumbent
- Assumed office January 1, 2021
- Preceded by: Brad Daw
- Constituency: 60th district (2021–2023); 57th district (2023–present)

Personal details
- Born: January 30, 1966 (age 60) Escondido, California, U.S.
- Party: Republican
- Spouse: Kirstin Abbott
- Children: 4
- Education: BYU (BA, MBA, JD)

Nelson T. Abbott (born January 30, 1966) is an American attorney and politician serving as a member of the Utah House of Representatives from the 57th district. Elected in November 2020, he assumed office on January 1, 2021. He serves on the Higher Education Appropriations Subcommittee, House Judiciary Committee, House Revenue and Taxation Committee, and Administrative Rules Review Committee.

== Early life and education ==
Abbott was born in Escondido, California and raised in Provo, Utah. He earned a Bachelor of Arts degree in economics, Master of Business Administration, and Juris Doctor from Brigham Young University.

== Career ==
Abbott was admitted to the Utah State Bar in 1994. Since then, he has owned and operated the Abbott Law Firm in Provo. In April 2020, Abbott defeated incumbent Republican Brad Daw at the Utah Republican Party's convention. Abbott did not face a Democratic opponent in the November 2020 general election and assumed office on January 1, 2021.

== Personal life ==
Abbott is married to Kirstin Abbott, has four children and lives in Orem, Utah.

== 2022 sponsored legislation ==
Bill	Status
Utah Rural Jobs Act Amendments	House/ enrolled bill to Printing 3/10/22
Judicial Performance Evaluation Commission Amendments	Governor signed 2/11/22
Commitment in Criminal Proceedings	House/ filed 3/4/22
Income Tax Rate Modifications	House/ filed 3/4/22
Governmental Entity Budget Transparency	House/ filed 3/4/22
Guardianship Bill of Rights	Draft of Enrolled Bill Prepared 3/8/22
Restitution Amendments	House/ enrolled bill to Printing 3/11/22
Theft by Extortion Amendments	House/ enrolled bill to Printing 3/11/22
