= Ariel Defay =

American politician

Member of the Utah House of Representatives from the 15th district
- Incumbent
- Assumed office November 15, 2023
- Preceded by: Brad Wilson

Personal details
- Party: Republican

Ariel Defay is an American politician and businesswoman. She is currently a Republican member of the 15th district of the Utah House of Representatives.

== Biography ==
Defay earned her Bachelor's degree in Political Science and Government from Utah State University and her Master of Public Administration from Ohio University. She has worked as the Marketing Director and Deputy Campaign Manager for Spencer Cox's campaign for the 2020 Utah gubernatorial election and as a County Field Representative for Mitt Romney's campaign for the 2018 United States Senate election in Utah. She currently works as the Vice President of Business Development at Defay Orthodontics.

== Political career ==
Defay won the election for the 15th district in Utah in 2024 against Josh Smith of the United Utah Party with 75.7% of the vote. During the 2025 session, Defay floor sponsored SB76, a bill banning minors from marrying someone four or more years their senior. In addition, she has worked on the following committees:

- Economic and Community Development Appropriations Subcommittee
- Education Interim Committee
- House Education Committee
- House Transportation Committee
- Transportation Interim Committee
