= Mike Petersen (Utah politician) =

American politician (born 1963)

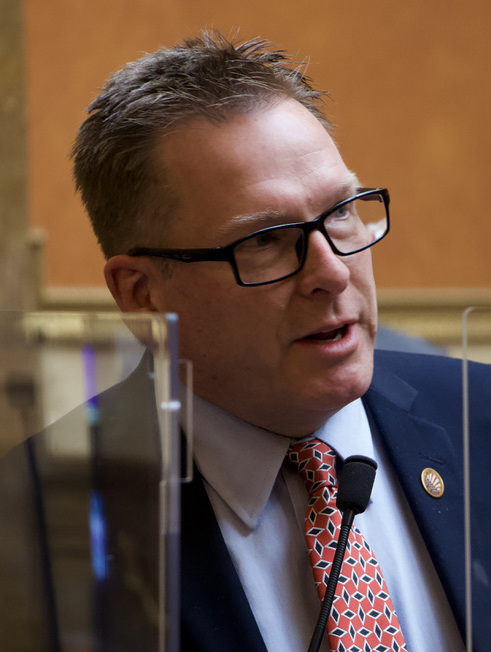

Member of the Utah House of Representatives
- Incumbent
- Assumed office January 1, 2021
- Preceded by: Val Potter
- Constituency: 3rd district (2021–2023); 2nd district (2023–present)

Personal details
- Born: August 23, 1963 (age 62) Ogden, Utah, U.S.
- Party: Republican
- Education: Brigham Young University (BS, MEd); Utah State University (PhD
- Website: https://web.archive.org/web/20200305162703/https://voteformikepetersen.com/

Mike Petersen (born August 23, 1963) is an American politician who serves in the Utah House of Representatives from the 2nd district. Petersen beat his predecessor, Val Potter, in a Republican primary, where he cited recent tax legislation as the need for change.

== Personal life ==
Mike Petersen graduated from Brigham Young University, receiving his general psychology BS in 1988 and his counseling psychology MEd in 1990. He subsequently studied at Utah State University, earning his instructional design and learning sciences PhD in 2012. He owns an education and training development company, LetterPress Software.

== Electoral Record ==
2024 Utah House of Representatives election, District 2
Party	Candidate	Votes	%
Republican	Mike Petersen	14,303	74
Democratic	Tom Liljegren	5,032	26
Total votes		19,335	100

2022 Utah House of Representatives election, District 2
Party	Candidate	Votes	%
Republican	Mike Petersen	10,238	72.7
Democratic	Holly Gunther	3,838	27.3
Total votes		14,076	100

2020 Utah House of Representatives election, District 3
Party	Candidate	Votes	%
Republican	Mike Petersen	15,197	73.7
Democratic	Holly Gunther	5,415	26.3
Total votes		20,612	100
