= R. Neil Walter =

American politician

Member of the Utah House of Representatives from the 74th district
- Incumbent
- Assumed office January 1, 2023

Personal details
- Party: Republican

R. Neil Walter is an American politician. He serves as a Republican member for the 74th district of the Utah House of Representatives.
