= Sahara Hayes =

American politician

Member of the Utah House of Representatives from the 32nd district
- Incumbent
- Assumed office January 1, 2023
- Preceded by: Suzanne Harrison

Personal details
- Born: Salt Lake City, Utah, U.S.
- Party: Democratic
- Education: Westminster College (BA); University of Utah (MPA)

Sahara Hayes is an American politician serving as a member of the Utah House of Representatives for the 32nd district. Elected in November 2022, she assumed office on January 1, 2023.

== Early life and education ==
Hayes was born and raised in Salt Lake City. She earned a Bachelor of Arts degree from Westminster College and a Master of Public Administration from the University of Utah.

== Career ==
Outside of politics, Hayes works as a grant writer. She served as a member of the Millcreek Community Council and on the board of the Utah Cultural Celebration Center Foundation. She was elected to the Utah House of Representatives in November 2022.

== Personal life ==
Hayes is a queer woman. Her partner is a transgender woman.
