= Matthew Gwynn =

American politician and law enforcement officer

Matt Gwynn
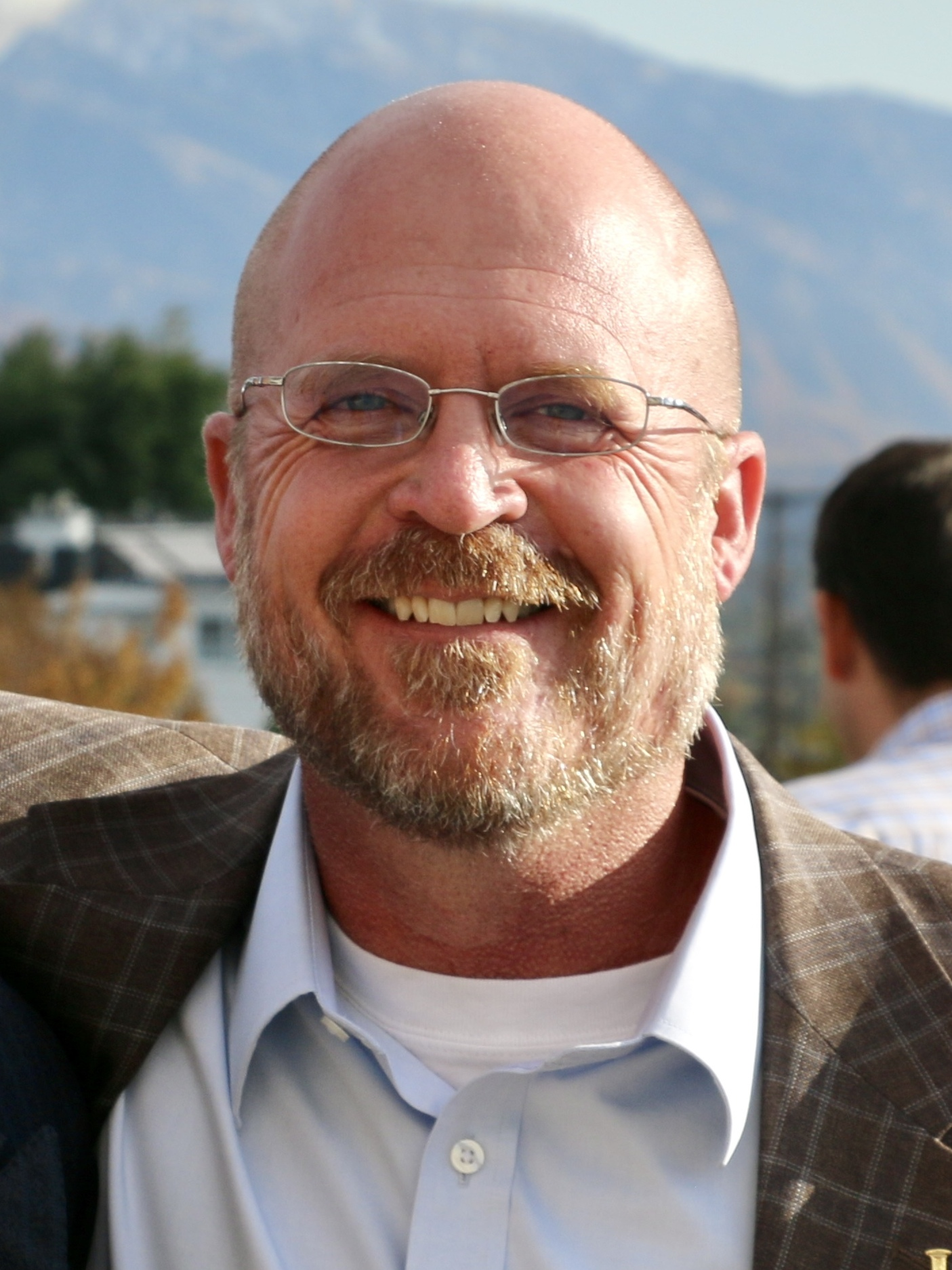
- Gwynn in 2023

Police Chief of Roy, Utah
- Incumbent
- Assumed office June 1, 2021
- Preceded by: Carl Merino

Member of the Utah House of Representatives
- In office January 1, 2021 – March 9, 2026
- Preceded by: Lee Perry
- Succeeded by: Rob Bishop
- Constituency: 29th district (2021–2023); 6th district (2023–2026)

Personal details
- Born: Ogden, Utah, U.S.
- Party: Republican
- Education: Weber State University (BS); Northwestern University (MA)

Military service
- Branch/service: United States Marine Corps (1995–1999); United States Air Force (2000–2004)

Matthew Gwynn is an American politician and law enforcement officer who served as a member of the Utah House of Representatives from the 6th district. Elected in November 2020, he assumed office on January 1, 2021, and resigned on March 9, 2026, to spend more time with his family.

== Early life and education ==
Gwynn was born and raised in Ogden, Utah. He earned a Bachelor of Science degree in political science from Weber State University and a Master of Arts in public policy and administration from Northwestern University.

== Career ==
Gwynn served in the United States Marine Corps and United States Air Force. From 2001 to 2003, Gwynn was a corrections officer with the Weber County Sheriff's Office. Since 2003, he has been a police officer in Roy, Utah. In June 2021, Gwynn was appointed to serve as police chief of Roy. Gwynn was also a member of the Farr West, Utah City Council until his election to the Utah House of Representatives. He resigned from the Utah House of Representatives in March 2026 to spend time with his family after his daughter was hit by a truck.
