= Joseph Elison =

American politician

Member of the Utah House of Representatives from the 72nd district
- Incumbent
- Assumed office January 1, 2023

Personal details
- Party: Republican

Joseph Elison is an American politician. He serves as a Republican member for the 72nd district of the Utah House of Representatives.
