= Mark Strong (politician) =

American politician

Member of the Utah House of Representatives
- Incumbent
- Assumed office January 1, 2019
- Preceded by: Dan McCay
- Constituency: 41st district (2019–2023); 47th district (2023–present)

Personal details
- Party: Republican
- Education: Brigham Young University (BA)
- Website: https://strong4utah.com/

Mark Ashby Strong is an American politician serving as a member of the Utah House of Representatives from the 47th district. Elected in November 2018, he assumed office on January 1, 2019.

== Education ==
Strong earned a Bachelor of Arts degree in communications with an emphasis in public relations from Brigham Young University.

== Career ==
Since 1994, he has worked as a sales manager at HOJ Innovations, an industrial equipment wholesaler. Strong was elected to the Utah House of Representatives in November 2018 and assumed office on January 1, 2019. In December 2019, Strong advocated for a Convention of States.

During the 2022 legislative session, Strong served on the Higher Education Appropriations Subcommittee, House Business and Labor Committee, and the House Revenue and Taxation Committee.
