= Katy Hall =

American politician

Member of the Utah House of Representatives from the 11th district
- Incumbent
- Assumed office January 1, 2023

Personal details
- Party: Republican

Katy Hall is an American politician who is a member of the Utah House of Representatives from District 11. She represents Davis and Weber counties.

== Political career ==
Hall joined 81 other lawmakers and the American Family Association (AFA) to author a brief on United States v. Skrmetti citing biblical verses. AFA has been listed as a hate group by the Southern Poverty Law Center (SPLC) since November 2010. The AFA brief was at odds with briefs filed by the American Academy of Pediatrics, the American Psychological Association, and the American Bar Association.

=== Legislation ===
In 2023, Hall sponsored a ban on gender affirming healthcare for youth. An ensuing report conducted by the University of Utah Drug Regimen Review Center found low risks for youth accessing standard hormonal treatments and that access to treatment reduced chance of youth suicide. Despite evidence to the contrary, Hall released a statement asserting scientific basis for the ban.

In 2024, Hall sponsored the controversial anti-DEI Utah bill HB261.
