= Utah House of Representatives =

Lower house of the Utah State Legislature

- Utah State Legislature

Type
- Type: Lower house
- Term limits: None

History
- New session started: January 21, 2025

Leadership
- Speaker: Mike Schultz (R) since November 15, 2023
- Speaker pro tempore: James Dunnigan (R) since January 17, 2023
- Majority Leader: Casey Snider (R) since June 3, 2025
- Minority Leader: Angela Romero (D) since January 17, 2023

Structure
- Seats: 75
- Political groups: Majority: Republican (61); Minority: Democratic (14)
- Length of term: 2 years
- Authority: Article VI, Utah Constitution
- Salary: $117/day + per diem

Elections
- Last election: November 5, 2024 (75 seats)
- Next election: November 3, 2026 (75 seats)
- Redistricting: Legislative Control

Meeting place
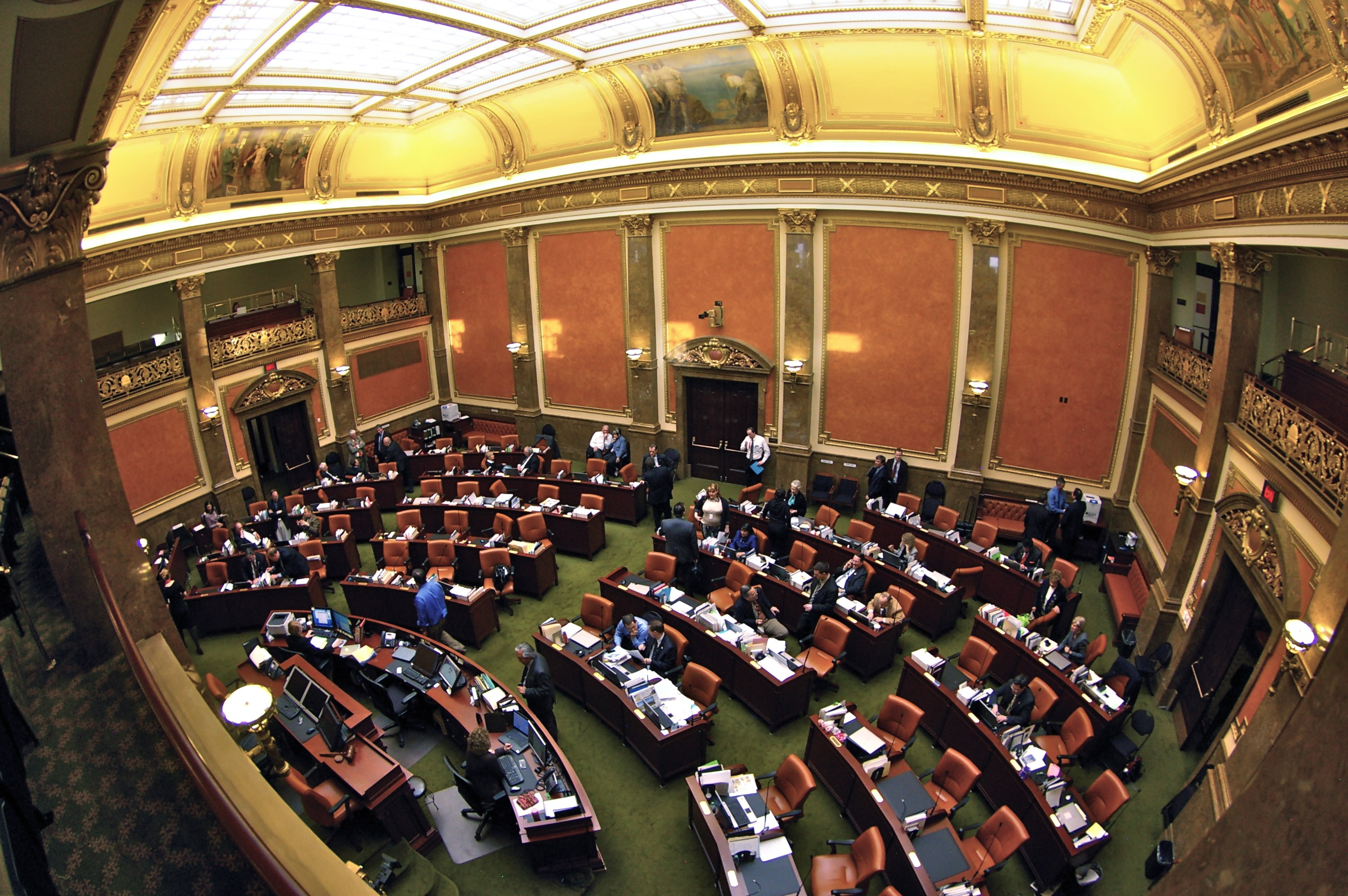
- House of Representatives Chamber; Utah State Capitol; Salt Lake City, Utah

Website
- Utah House of Representatives

The Utah House of Representatives is the lower house of the Utah State Legislature, the state legislature of the U.S. state of Utah. The House is composed of 75 representatives elected from single member constituent districts. Each district contains an average population of 44,000 people. Members of the House are elected to two-year terms without term limits. The House convenes at the Utah State Capitol in Salt Lake City.

== Composition of the House of Representatives ==
Affiliation	Party (Shading indicates majority caucus)		Total	Vacant
Affiliation	Republican	Democratic	Total	Vacant
2011–2012 legislature (59th)	58	17	75	0
2013–2014 legislature (60th)	61	14	75	0
2015–2016 legislature (61st)	63	12	75	0
2017–2018 legislature (62nd)	62	13	75	0
2019–2020 legislature (63rd)	59	16	75	0
2021–2022 legislature (64th)	58	17	75	0
2023–2024 legislature (65th)	61	14	75	0
2025–2026 legislature (66th)	61	14	75	0
Latest voting share	81%	19%		

=== Current leaders ===
Position	Name	Party	District
Speaker of the House	Mike Schultz	Republican	12
Majority Leader	Casey Snider	Republican	5
Majority Whip	Candice Pierucci	Republican	49
Majority Assistant Whip	Bridger Bolinder	Republican	29
Minority Leader	Angela Romero	Democratic	25
Minority Whip	Jennifer Dailey-Provost	Democratic	22
Minority Assistant Whip	Sahara Hayes	Democratic	32

=== Members of the 66th House of Representatives ===
District	Name	Party	Counties	Residence	Start
1	Thomas Peterson	Rep	Box Elder, Cache	Brigham City	2022 (Note: Originally appointed.)
2	Mike Petersen	Rep	Cache	North Logan	2021
3	Jason Thompson	Rep	Cache	River Heights	2025
4	Tiara Auxier	Rep	Daggett, Duchesne, Morgan, Rich, Summit	Morgan	2025
5	Casey Snider	Rep	Cache	Paradise	2018
6	Rob Bishop (Note: Bishop previously served in the state house from 1978–1994.)	Rep	Box Elder, Weber	Brigham City	2026
7	Ryan Wilcox (Note: Wilcox previously served in the state house from 2009–2014.)	Rep	Weber	Ogden	2021
8	Jason Kyle	Rep	Morgan, Weber	Huntsville	2023
9	Jake Sawyer	Rep	Weber		2025
10	Jill Koford	Rep	Weber	Ogden	2025
11	Katy Hall	Rep	Davis, Weber	South Ogden	2023
12	Mike Schultz	Rep	Davis, Weber	Hooper	2015
13	Karen M. Peterson	Rep	Davis	Clinton	2022
14	Karianne Lisonbee	Rep	Davis	Clearfield	2017
15	Ariel Defay	Rep	Davis	Kaysville	2023
16	Vacant (Note: Trevor Lee resigned on September 28, 2026)	Rep	Davis		
17	Stewart Barlow	Rep	Davis	Fruit Heights	2011
18	Paul A. Cutler	Rep	Davis	Centerville	2023
19	Raymond Ward	Rep	Davis	Bountiful	2015
20	Melissa Ballard	Rep	Davis	North Salt Lake	2019
21	Sandra Hollins	Dem	Salt Lake	Salt Lake City	2015
22	Jennifer Dailey-Provost	Dem	Salt Lake	Salt Lake City	2019
23	Hoang Nguyen	Dem	Salt Lake, Summit	Salt Lake City	2025
24	Grant Miller	Dem	Salt Lake	Salt Lake City	2025
25	Angela Romero	Dem	Salt Lake	Salt Lake City	2013
26	Matt MacPherson	Rep	Salt Lake	West Valley City	2023
27	Anthony Loubet	Rep	Salt Lake	Kearns	2023
28	Nicholeen P. Peck	Rep	Tooele	Tooele	2025
29	Bridger Bolinder	Rep	Juab, Millard, Tooele	Grantsville	2023
30	Jake Fitisemanu	Dem	Salt Lake	West Valley City	2025
31	Verona Mauga	Dem	Salt Lake	Taylorsville	2025
32	Sahara Hayes	Dem	Salt Lake	Millcreek	2023
33	Doug Owens	Dem	Salt Lake	Millcreek	2021
34	Carol Moss	Dem	Salt Lake	Holladay	2001
35	Rosalba Dominguez	Dem	Salt Lake	Murray	2025
36	James Dunnigan	Rep	Salt Lake	Taylorsville	2003
37	Ashlee Matthews	Dem	Salt Lake	West Jordan	2021
38	Cheryl Acton	Rep	Salt Lake	West Jordan	2017
39	Ken Ivory (Note: Ivory previously served in the state house from 2011–2019.)	Rep	Salt Lake	West Jordan	2021
40	Andrew Stoddard	Dem	Salt Lake	Sandy	2019
41	John Arthur	Dem	Salt Lake		2025
42	Clinton Okerlund	Rep	Salt Lake	Sandy	2025
43	Steve Eliason	Rep	Salt Lake	Sandy	2011
44	Jordan Teuscher	Rep	Salt Lake	South Jordan	2021
45	Tracy Miller	Rep	Salt Lake	South Jordan	2025
46	Calvin Roberts	Rep	Salt Lake	Draper	2025
47	Mark Strong	Rep	Salt Lake	Bluffdale	2019
48	Doug Fiefia	Rep	Salt Lake	Herriman	2025
49	Candice Pierucci	Rep	Salt Lake	Herriman	2019
50	Stephanie Gricius	Rep	Utah	Eagle Mountain	2023
51	Leah Hansen	Rep	Utah	Saratoga Springs	2025
52	Cory Maloy	Rep	Utah	Lehi	2017
53	Kay Christofferson	Rep	Utah	Lehi	2013
54	Kristen Chevrier	Rep	Utah	Highland	2025
55	Jon Hawkins	Rep	Utah	Pleasant Grove	2019
56	Val Peterson	Rep	Utah	Orem	2011
57	Nelson Abbott	Rep	Utah	Orem	2021
58	David Shallenberger	Rep	Utah	Orem	2025
59	Mike Kohler	Rep	Summit, Wasatch	Midway	2021
60	Grant Pace	Rep	Utah	Provo	2026
61	Lisa Shepherd	Rep	Utah	Provo	2025
62	Norm Thurston	Rep	Utah	Provo	2015
63	Stephen L. Whyte	Rep	Utah	Provo	2021
64	Jackie Larson	Rep	Utah	Spanish Fork	2026
65	Doug Welton	Rep	Utah	Payson	2021
66	Troy Shelley	Rep	Juab, Sanpete	Ephraim	2025
67	Christine Watkins	Rep	Carbon, Duchesne, Emery, Grand	Price	2017
68	Scott Chew	Rep	Duchesne, Uintah	Jensen	2015
69	Logan Monson	Rep	Emery, Garfield, Grand, Kane, San Juan, Wayne	Blanding	2025
70	Carl Albrecht	Rep	Beaver, Iron, Piute, Sevier	Richfield	2017
71	Rex Shipp	Rep	Iron	Cedar City	2019
72	Joseph Elison	Rep	Washington	Toquerville	2023
73	Colin W. Jack	Rep	Washington	St. George	2022
74	R. Neil Walter	Rep	Washington	St. George	2023
75	Walt Brooks	Rep	Washington	St. George	2016

== See also ==
- Utah State Legislative districts
- Utah State Senate
- List of Utah State Legislatures
- Elections in Utah
- Utah Republican Party
- Utah Democratic Party
