= Corredor =

Corredor is a surname. Notable people with the surname include:

- Beatriz Corredor (born 1968), Spanish lawyer and politician, Minister of Housing 2008 to 2010
- Diego Guerrero Corredor (born 1986), Venezuelan international footballer
- Edgar Corredor (born 1960), Colombian former professional racing cyclist
- Israel Corredor (born 1959), Colombian former professional racing cyclist
- Josep Maria Corredor i Pomés (1912–1981), Catalan writer, translator, teacher and cultural activist
- Maritza Corredor (born 1969), former road cyclist from Colombia
- Monte Ibérico-Corredor de Almansa, comarca of the Province of Albacete, Spain
- Oscar Cortes Corredor, retired Colombian football player
- Pedro Ruíz Corredor, Spanish conquistador
- Victor Corredor or Víctor Niño (born 1973), Colombian professional racing cyclist

== See also ==
- Finca Corredor, town in the Chiriquí province of Panama
- Santuari del Corredor (Shrine of the Corredor) is a 16th-century hermitage within the municipality of Dosrius, Spain
- Corredor Duarte or DR-1, dual carriageway highway, part of the five designated national highways of the Dominican Republic
- Corredor Biologico Mesoamericano (Mesoamerican Biological Corridor) consists of several Central American countries
- Corredor Logistico Integrado do Norte (Integrated Northern Logistical Corridor), a railway joint venture in Mozambique
- Corredor Polonês (Portuguese for Polish Corridor) studio album by Brazilian post-punk/experimental rock band Patife Band
- Corredor Público, legal professional in Mexico with specific functions in the field of commerce
- Border Corridor Wildlife Refuge (Spanish: Refugio de Vida Silvestre Corredor Fronterizo), wildlife refuge in the northern part of Costa Rica along the border with Nicaragua
- Corredor Tijuana-Rosarito 2000, a freeway in northwestern Baja California connecting the Mesa de Otay area with Rosarito Beach
