= Broker =

Person who arranges transactions between a buyer and a seller for a commission

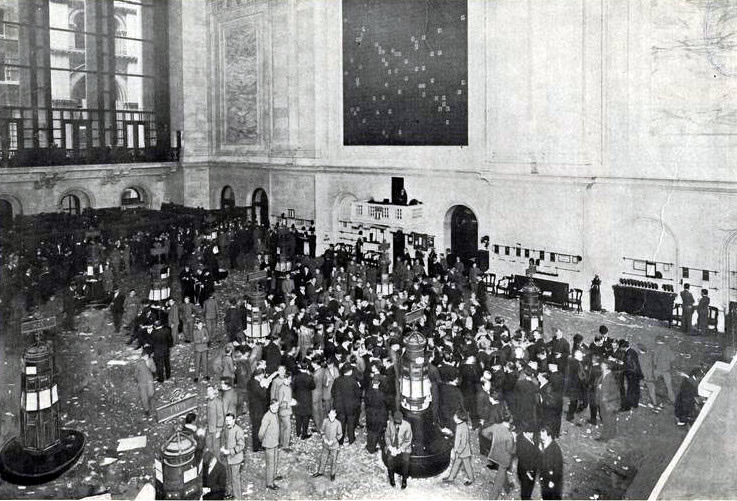
Brokers on the floor of the New York Stock Exchange, 1908

A broker is a person or entity that arranges transactions between a buyer and a seller. This may be done for a commission when the deal is executed. A broker who also acts as a seller or as a buyer becomes a principal party to the deal. Neither role should be confused with that of an agent—one who acts on behalf of a principal party in a deal.

== Definition ==
A broker is an independent party whose services are used extensively in some industries. A broker's prime responsibility is to bring sellers and buyers together and thus a broker is the third-person facilitator between a buyer and a seller. An example would be a real estate broker who facilitates the sale of a property.

Brokers can furnish market research and market data. Brokers may represent either the seller or the buyer but generally not both at the same time. Brokers are expected to have the tools and resources to reach the largest possible base of buyers and sellers. They then screen these potential buyers or sellers for the perfect match. An individual producer, on the other hand, especially one new in the market, probably will not have the same access to customers as a broker. Another benefit of using a broker is cost—they might be cheaper in smaller markets, with smaller accounts, or with a limited line of products.

Some brokers, known as discount brokers, charge smaller commission, sometimes in exchange for offering less advice or services than full service brokerage firms.

A broker-dealer is a broker that transacts for its own account, in addition to facilitating transactions for clients.

Brokerage firms are generally subject to regulations based on the type of brokerage and jurisdictions in which they operate. Examples of brokerage firm regulatory agencies include the U.S. Securities and Exchange Commission and the Financial Industry Regulatory Authority (FINRA), which regulate stockbrokers in the United States.

== Etymology ==
The word "broker" derives from Old French broceur "small trader", of uncertain origin, but possibly from Old French brocheor meaning "wine retailer", which comes from the verb brochier, or "to broach (a keg)".

== Types of brokers ==
- Auto transport broker
- Broker-dealer
- Business broker
- Commodity broker
- Corredor Público
- Customs broker
- Data broker
- Freight broker
- Insurance broker
- Intellectual property brokering
- Inter-dealer broker
- List broker
- Matchmaking
- Message broker
- Mortgage broker
- Pawnbroker
- Power broker
- Prime brokerage
- Real estate broker
- Shipbroking
- Shipping agency
- Sponsorship broker
- Stockbroker
- Office broker
- Yacht broker
