= Freight company =

Companies that specialize in the moving of cargo from one place to another

Freight companies are companies that specialize in the moving (or "forwarding") of freight, or cargo, from one place to another. These companies are divided into several variant sections. For example, international freight forwarders ship goods internationally from country to country, and domestic freight forwarders, ship goods within a single country.

There are thousands of freight companies in business worldwide, many of which are members of certain organizations. Such organizations include the IATA (International Air Transport Association), TIA (Transportation Intermediaries Association) the BIFA (British International Freight Association), or the FTA (Freight Transport Association) and various or other regional organisations.

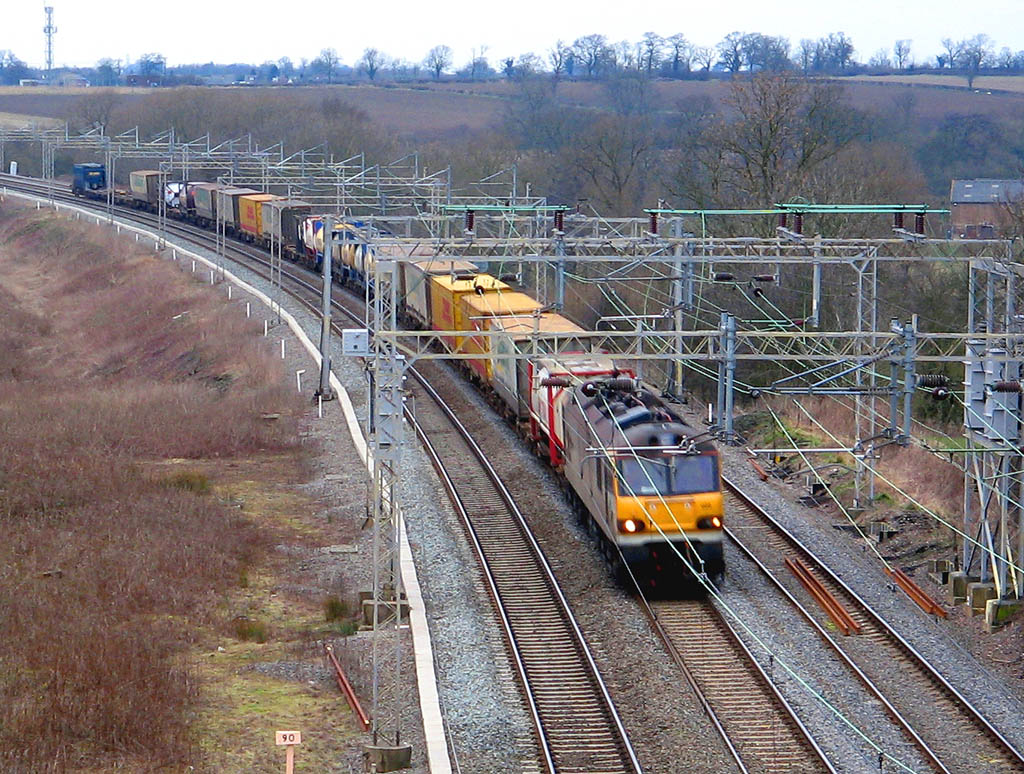
An electric container freight train

There are various methods of shipping goods; by air, road, sea, or rail. Some companies offer multi-modal solutions, this means that they offer more than one service, in many cases air and sea and in other cases air, sea, and road. The most common multi-modal way of shipping is referred to as inter-modal meaning truck pickup to rail to truck delivery.

A shipping method is determined by evaluating three factors: time, cost, and product characteristics. While shipping by sea could take longer than shipping by air, the latter is generally more expensive. Shipping by rail could also be complemented by piggybacking the freight onto a truck so it can be delivered to the receiver.

== Couriers ==
Courier companies are usually spin-offs from freight forwarders. There are various types of courier companies, such as airfreight courier companies or road couriers.

== Logistics brokers ==
Freight brokers are federally regulated and bonded companies. Most commonly they have a vast network and access to a library of freight carriers and search for the right availability based on customer specifications. These brokers also offer various value-added services that encompass transportation, logistics, and distribution. Typically, freight brokers do not "fingerprint", or touch, the freight. They engage in helping shippers find the best price with the best carrier for any given load.

The proliferation of freight brokers called for an increase in financial integrity and liability of these companies, which has led to the passing of the Moving Ahead for Progress in the 21st Century Act (MAP-21). In order to obtain a license to broker freight, a freight brokerage must purchase a surety bond or trust agreement with the Federal Motor Carrier Safety Administration (FMCSA). Prior to June 2012 when the bill was signed by President Obama, the surety bond coverage required to hold a broker license was $10,000. Effective October 1, 2013, the surety bond requirement increased to $75,000. On December 12, 2015, the FMCSA brought into effect the United Registration System. Existing freight brokers with a USDOT, MC, or FF number could continue to do business until April 14, 2017, before they must switch to the electronic online URS system.

A recent trend is for freight brokers to specialize in offering automated platforms to shippers so that they can tender their own loads.

Other logistics companies include 3rd-Party Logistics Providers. They offer a variety of supply chain and distribution-related practices and techniques in order to improve in-house logistics. The main difference between a traditional freight broker and most 3rd-Party Logistics Providers is that freight brokers do not actually touch (fingerprint) the freight, whereas 3rd-Party Logistics providers often do. This can happen, for example, when the 3rd-Party Logistics company handles outsourced manufacturing and/or warehousing.

== Third-party broker liability ==
In Schramm, the Courts opened the door for freight brokers to be held legally liable in the case of a trucking accident, involving a carrier whom they hired to carry freight, that resulted in injury to a person. Many guidelines, most under the Federal Motor Carrier Safety Administration's SAFER System, are available to freight brokers to screen potential carrier safety and, if it is proven that the broker did not utilize these government provided tools, liability can be transferred to or shared with them in the result of an injury accident. Another regulation that protects carriers and shippers is the freight broker bond - freight brokers must get bonded in order to operate legally. If a carrier files a claim, the bond would cover it.
