= Water holding capacity =

Water holding capacity may refer to:

- Available water capacity
- Meat water holding capacity
- Field capacity
