= Iranian Society of Animal Science =

The Iranian Society of Animal Science (ISAS) is a non-profit professional organization for the advancement of livestock, companion animals, exotic animals and meat science. Founded in 2005, ISAS is headquartered in Tehran. Journal of Livestock Science and Technologies is the official journal of the Iranian Society of Animal Sciences.
