= Meat absorbent pad =

Absorbent pad in pre-packaged meats

A meat absorbent pad in a package of rib eye steak

A meat absorbent pad or meat pad, colloquially known in North America as a meat diaper, refers to the absorbent pad found in pre-packaged (or case-ready) meats. Its purpose is to absorb exudate released from the meat during storage and transportation, helping maintain the meat's appearance and reduce spoilage. Case-ready meats almost always contain one or two meat absorbent pads which absorb and retain the juices, blood, and other fluids that seep from the meats, which can be messy, may leak, are often contaminated with bacteria, and are generally unsightly for the consumer.

Chilling meat can help reduce the amount of exudate that is released from the meat, which is also known as drip, purge, or weep. However, it is normal for meat to lose 1–2 percent of its weight due to this liquid loss, while anything more is considered excessive.

In the United States, meat absorbent pads are food contact materials. As such, under the Federal Food, Drug, and Cosmetic Act, suppliers using them are required to maintain a "Letter of Guaranty" on file.

== Construction ==
Several constructions for meat absorbent pads have been developed. The absorbent pads are typically made from materials such as cellulose, silica gel, sorbent nonwoven fabric, superabsorbent polymers, or other absorptive materials that can hold a significant amount of liquid relative to their size. They are usually covered in a non-toxic plastic wrapping that allows the liquid to seep in and stay trapped within the pad. Antimicrobials are sometimes included. The pads help regulate drip loss, and their size is in part determined by the meat water holding capacity.

Readily biodegradable meat drip pads are available, though in limited use due to their higher costs. While packaging waste is a concern, the main priority for vendors is to minimize food waste caused by spoilage. Active packaging antibacterial indicator absorbent pads that inhibit bacterial growth and visually signal meat deterioration are being explored through the use of nanofibers and silver nanoparticles.

If the absorbent pads are accidentally cooked to the point of melting, the associated meat should not be consumed. If the pads are pre-moistened to add weight to the package, it may be considered to be a form of weight fraud.
