= Stephanie Gricius =

American politician

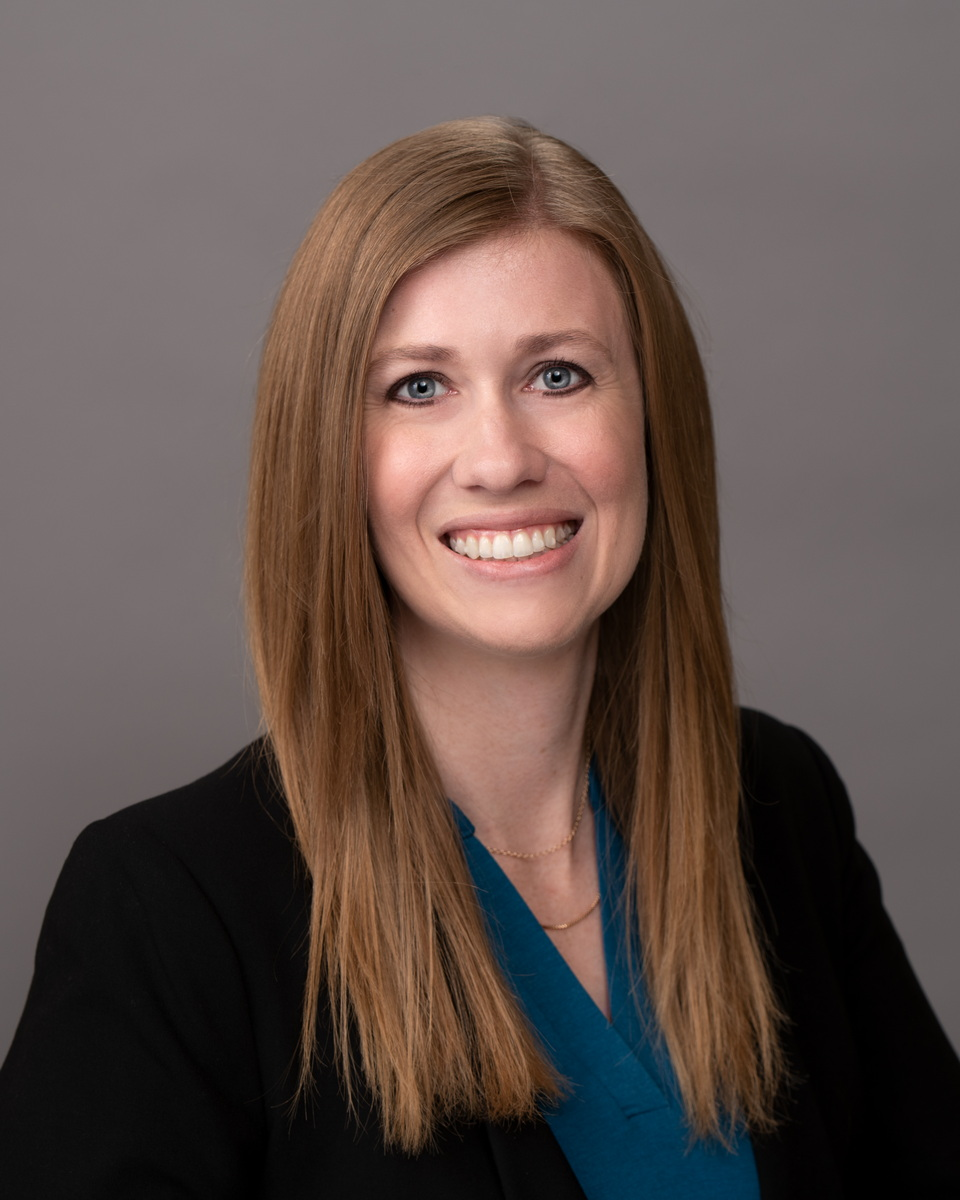
- Official 2023-2024 photo

Member of the Utah House of Representatives from the 50th district
- Incumbent
- Assumed office January 1, 2023

Personal details
- Party: Republican

Stephanie Gricius is an American politician. She serves as a Republican member for the 50th district of the Utah House of Representatives. She assumed office in January 2023.

Gricius began her political career in 2014, successfully running for city council in Eagle Mountain, Utah due to her opposition to a proposal to relocate the Utah State Prison to Eagle Mountain. She assumed office in 2015, serving until January 2020. During her time on the Council, Meta Platforms (then Facebook) built a 970,000 square foot datacenter in Eagle Mountain, and Tyson Foods built a case-ready beef and pork plant that was to initially create 800 jobs.

Gricius served as precinct chair for her district for the Utah County Republican Party from 2016 to 2021.

== Sponsored Legislation ==
Gricius was the chief sponsor of 2025 HB 269, a bill that was signed into law banning transgender students at public colleges and universities from living in sex-designated dorm rooms corresponding with their gender identities. Students must either live in a room corresponding to their sex assigned at birth or in a "gender neutral" dorm.

Gricius was the chief sponsor of 2025 HB 81, a bill that made Utah the first state to ban fluoride in public water systems. The bill was opposed by the American Dental Association.

Gricius was the House sponsor for 2025 SB 188, a bill which changed the policies governing the creation of new school districts.

Gricius was the chief sponsor for 2025 HB 379, a bill that amends 27 existing laws to use, when available, population data from the Utah Population Committee in favor of data from the US Census Bureau, for various calculations. One effect of the bill was to increase the calculated population of the city in which Gricius resides, Eagle Mountain City, for purposes of determining issues such as transportation funding.

== Legislative Service ==
Gricius assumed office in 2023 and has held committee positions including: Vice Chair of the Social Services Appropriations Subcommittee, Chair of the Administrative Rules Review and General Oversight Committee, Chair of the Judiciary Interim Committee, member of the Health and Human Services Committee, member of the Government Operations Committee, and in 2025, a member of the Legislative Redistricting Committee.

Gricius currently serves on the House of Representatives Majority Leadership Team as the House Majority Caucus Manager. She also sits on the boards for the Utah Lake Authority and Indigent Defense Commission.

Gricius is the chair of the Sportsman's Caucus, Conservative Caucus, and the Utah County Caucus.

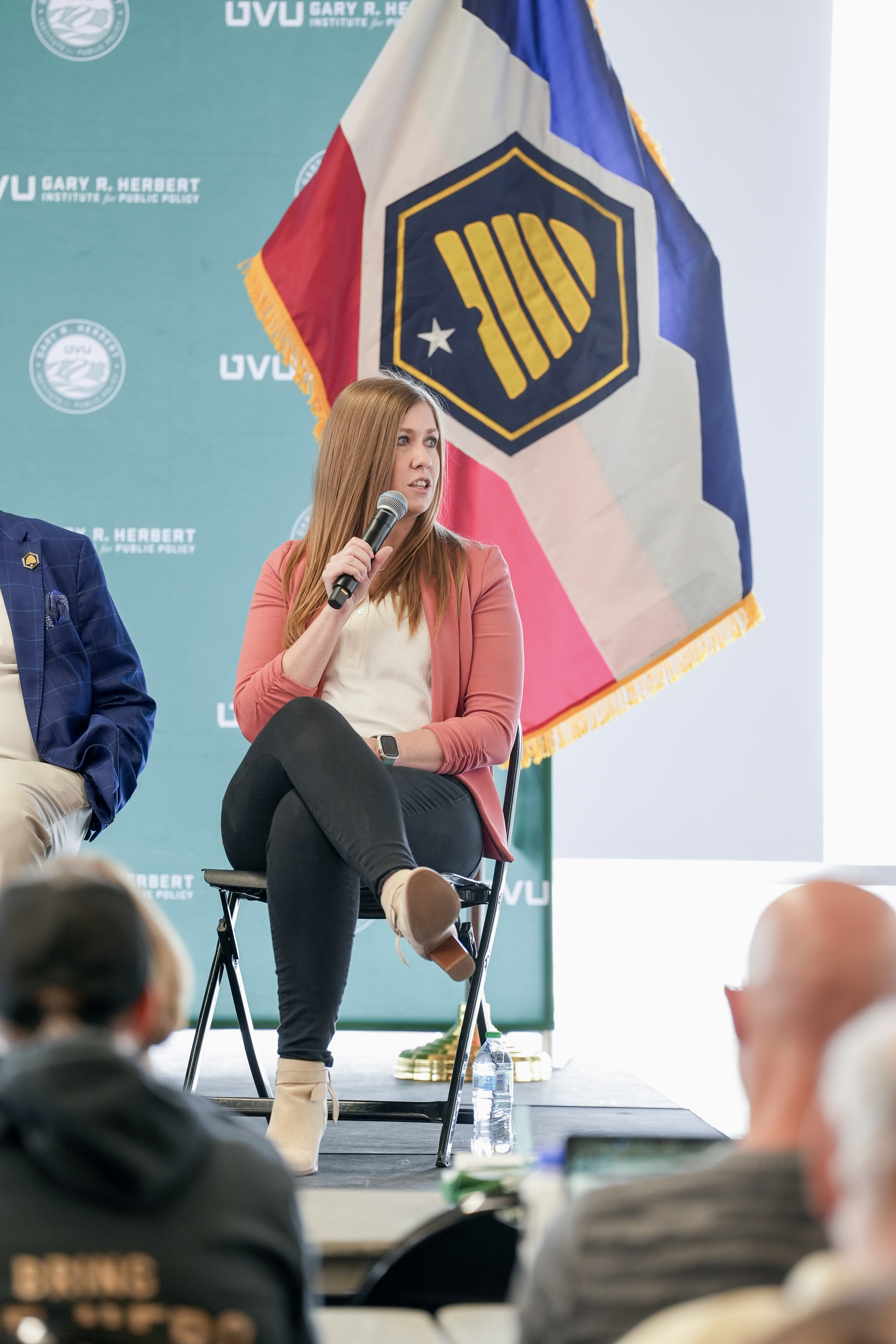
Representative Gricius speaks to a group at UVU's Herbert Policy Institute

== Personal life ==
Gricius lives in Eagle Mountain, UT, with her husband Christopher Gricius and their five children. As of 2025 the couple reported keeping two dogs, seven ducks, and reptiles and other small animals. Gricius served as a volunteer t-ball coach for the YMCA when she was 14.
