= Freight broker =

Intermediary between a shipper and a freight service provider

A freight broker is an intermediary between a shipper and a freight service provider. Freight brokers can specialize in certain types of freight, such as equipment hauling on lowboys, oversize, bulk tanker, auto, or other types of freight transportation.

A freight broker in the United States must be licensed by the Federal Motor Carrier Safety Administration (FMCSA) and be granted authority as verifiable via the FMCSA Licensing & Insurance database.

A freight broker, in freight transport (cargo), over land in the United States by truck is often used as part of the logistics. This may be part of an overall shipbroking using a cargo broker, a freight forwarder, third party logistics broker (3PL), and even a fourth-party broker, when outsourcing is needed (as opposed to in-house) for freight transportation. The brokering can be single mode or by multimodal transportation and can use specialized brokers on a permanent basis or as needed to ensure timely traffic management.

A load may be posted on a truck load board by shippers, brokers, or agents. This may occur with special orders, brokers and/or agents that do not have an established logistics base, or brokers and agents seeking a backhaul for a truck not in a high-traffic lane. Many brokers specialize in certain freight such as full truckload (FTL) or less than truckload, auto, boat or yacht, bulk tanker (liquid or dry goods), oversize, equipment hauling on lowboys, flatbed, drop deck, or any other mode of freight transportation with enough loads.

== Co-brokering ==
Co-brokering is a legal practice used to ensure there is an available truck to transport freight. A 4PL may use a 3PL broker to match loads with trucks, with a shipper's knowledge. The primary broker will take a lesser amount of the fee and the secondary broker will book the load for transport receiving a larger share of the same fee.

=== Concerns ===
Double-brokering or rebrokering is illegal in the United States and occurs when a broker charges a fee then contracts the load to a second broker who will reduce the freight charge also collecting a fee that can be up to 15%. For example, an $1,150 load going 400 miles would net a carrier $977.50, but the same load double-brokered might result in $875.00 to the carrier. This margin on the second booking would net the broker an additional 14.3%. The shipper may not be aware of this and the contracted truck will likely not be dispatched to pick up the load. This might have serious ramifications in case of an accident or incident, especially if there are operating issues with the carrier. Confusion on payment might lead to a possessory lien (as opposed to "freight charges held hostage."), a load not delivered, and lawsuits.

== See also ==
- Weight fraud
