= Oicatá =

Oicata
- Municipality and town
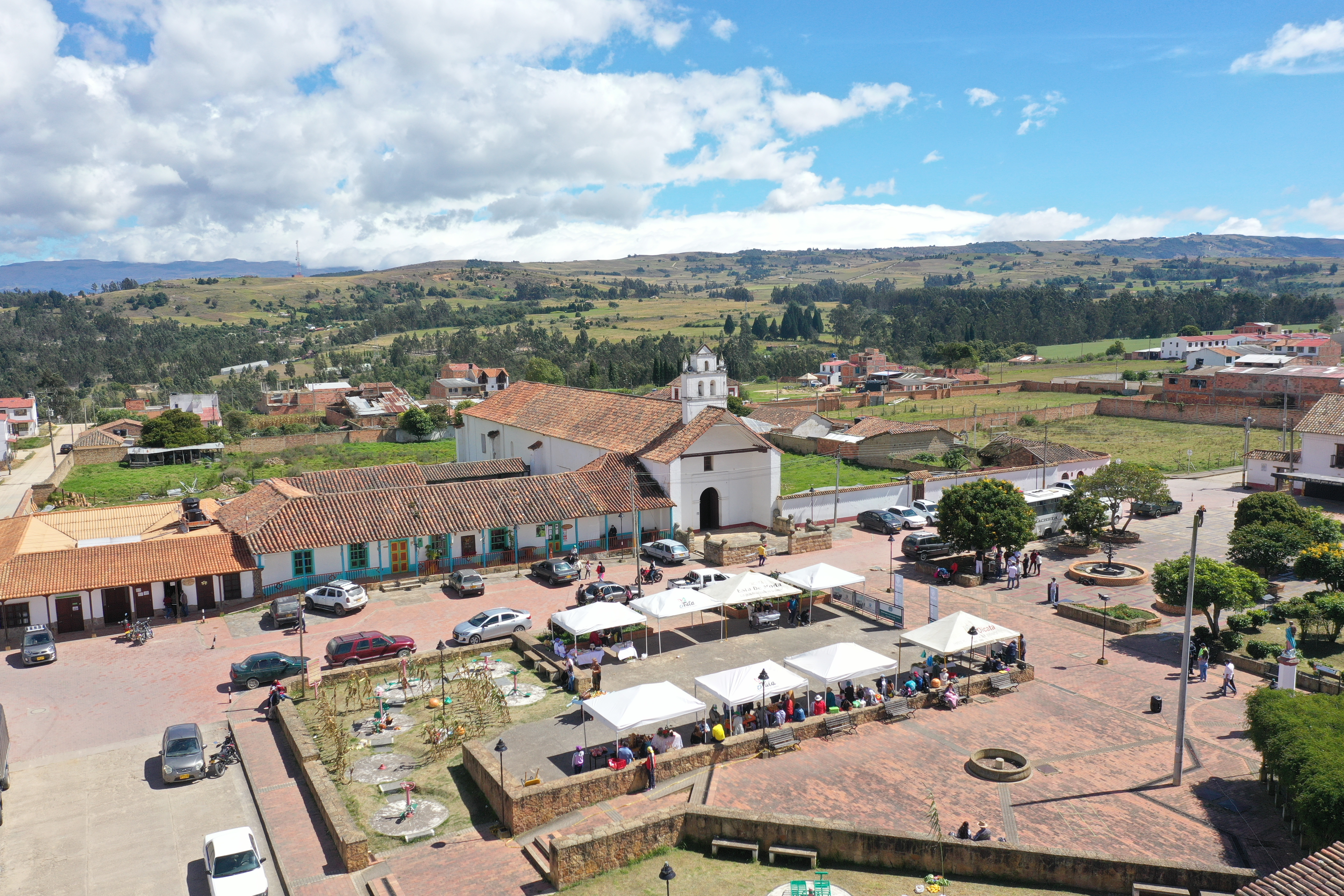
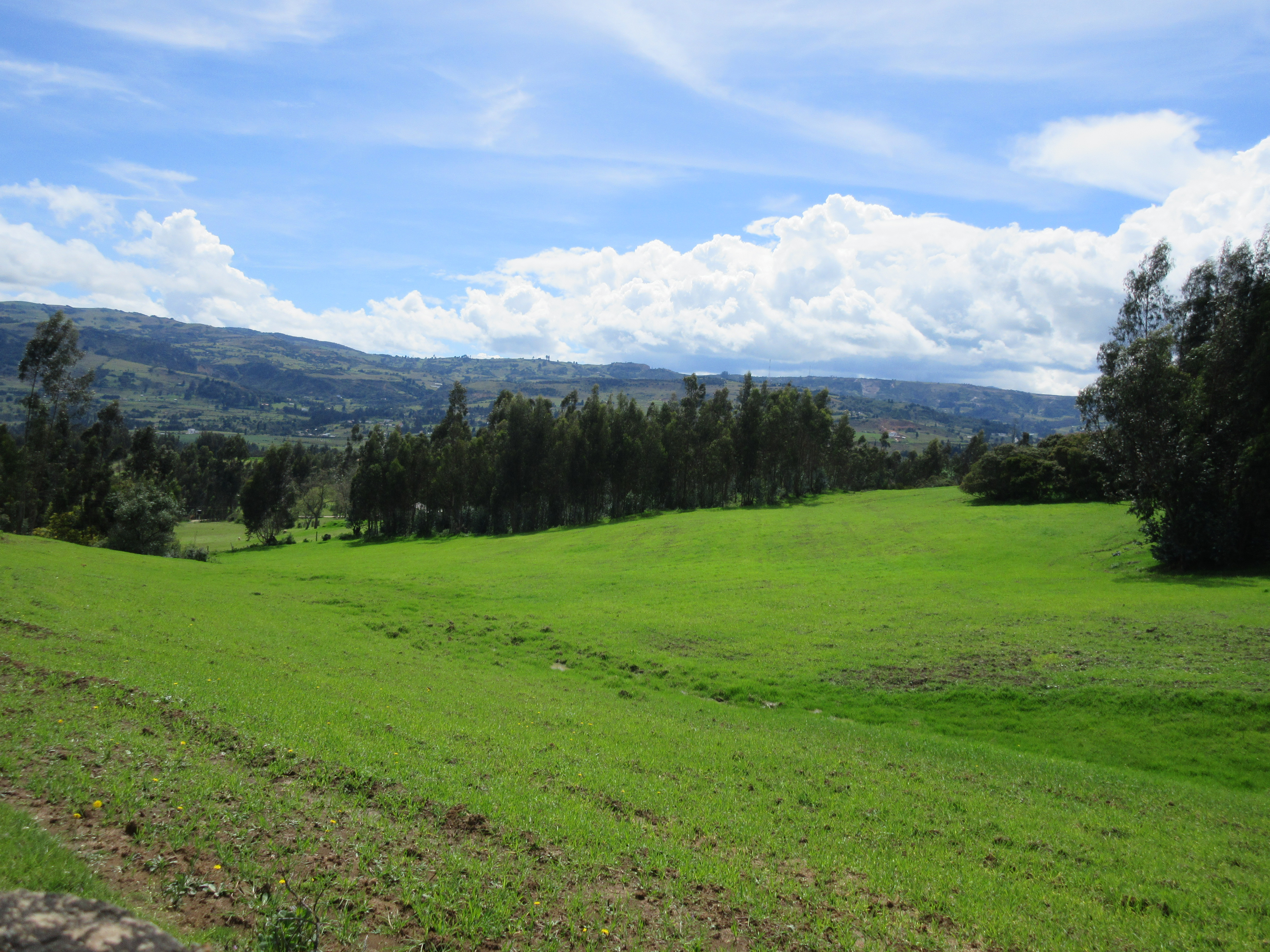
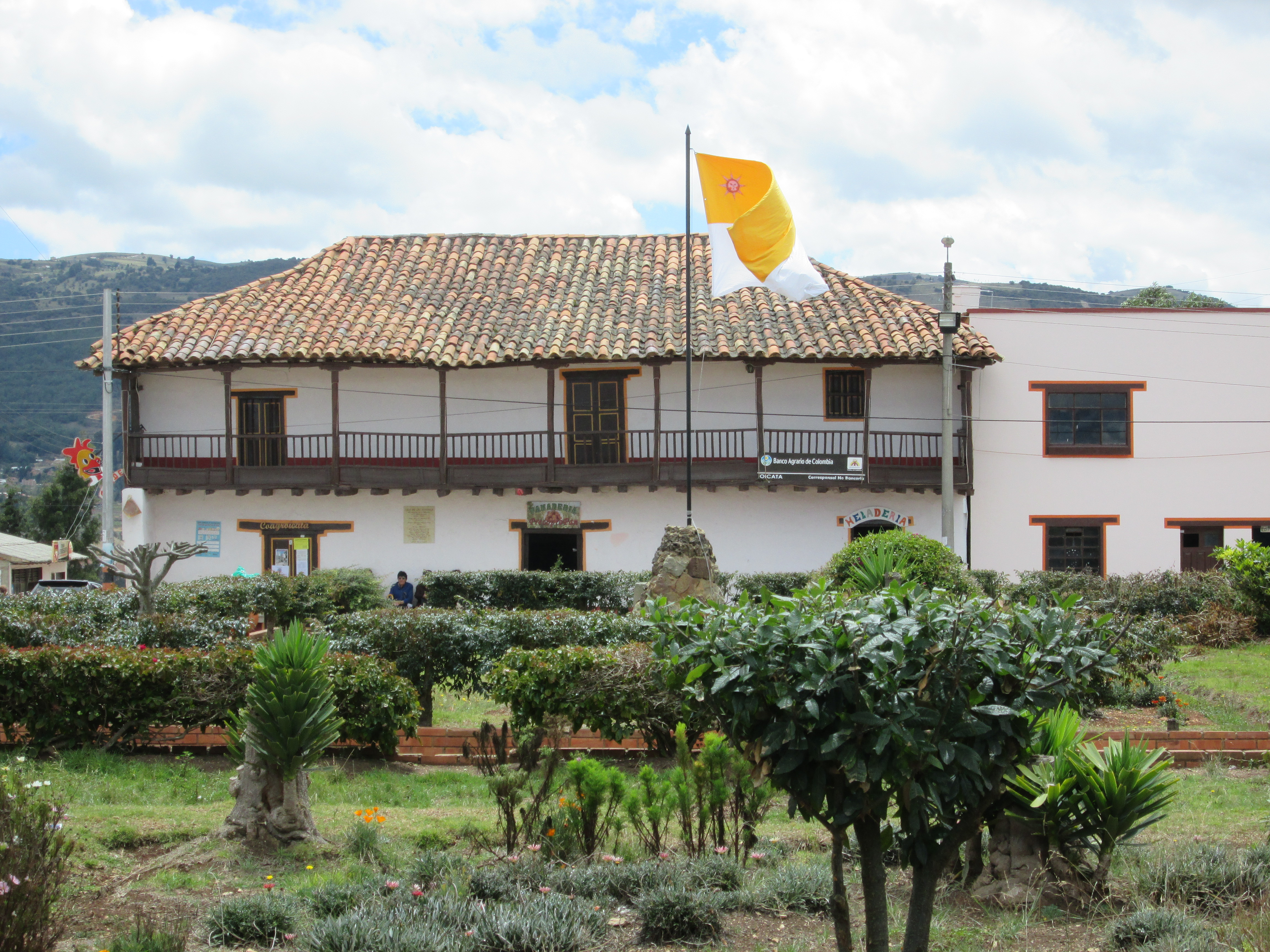
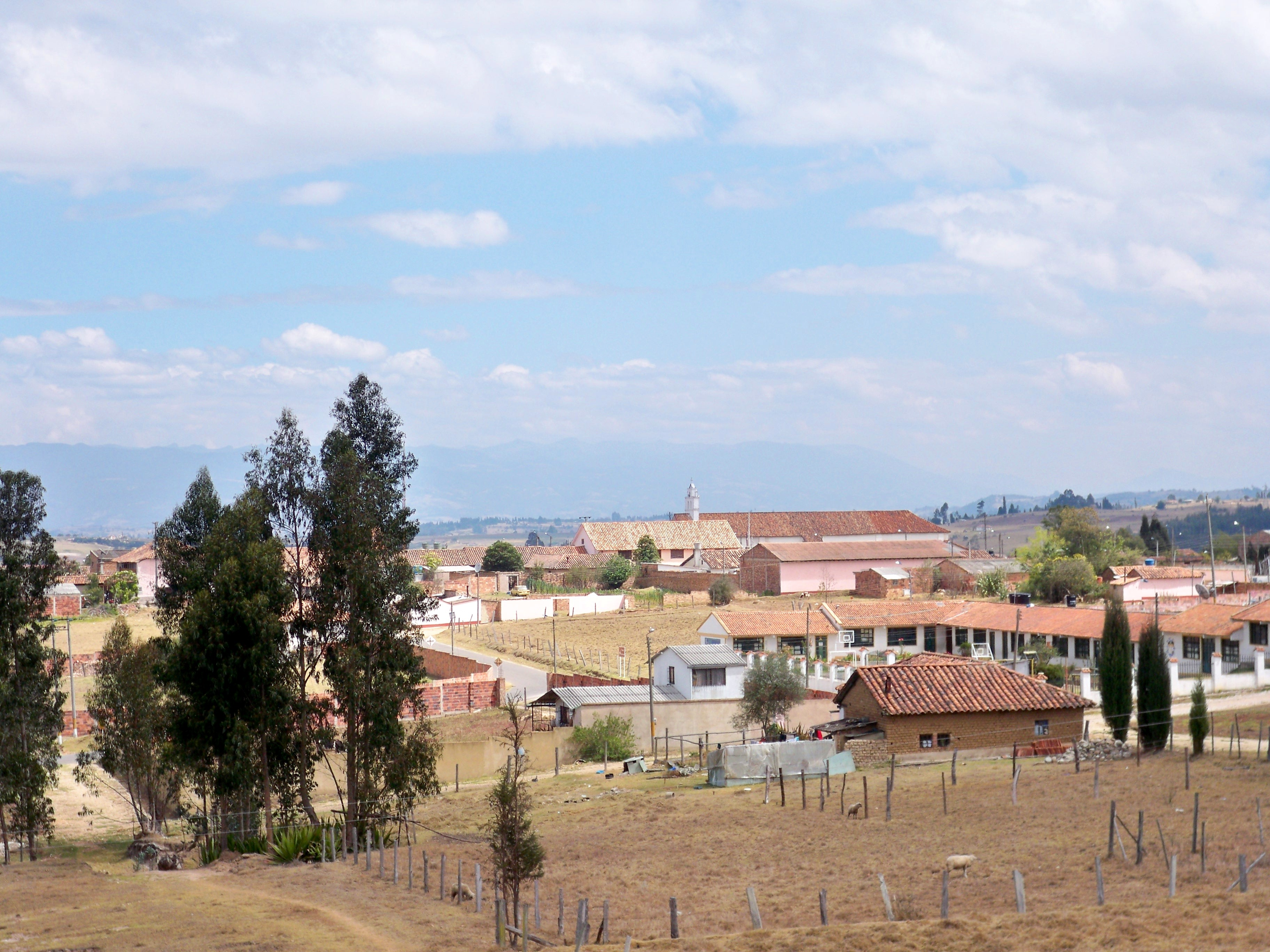
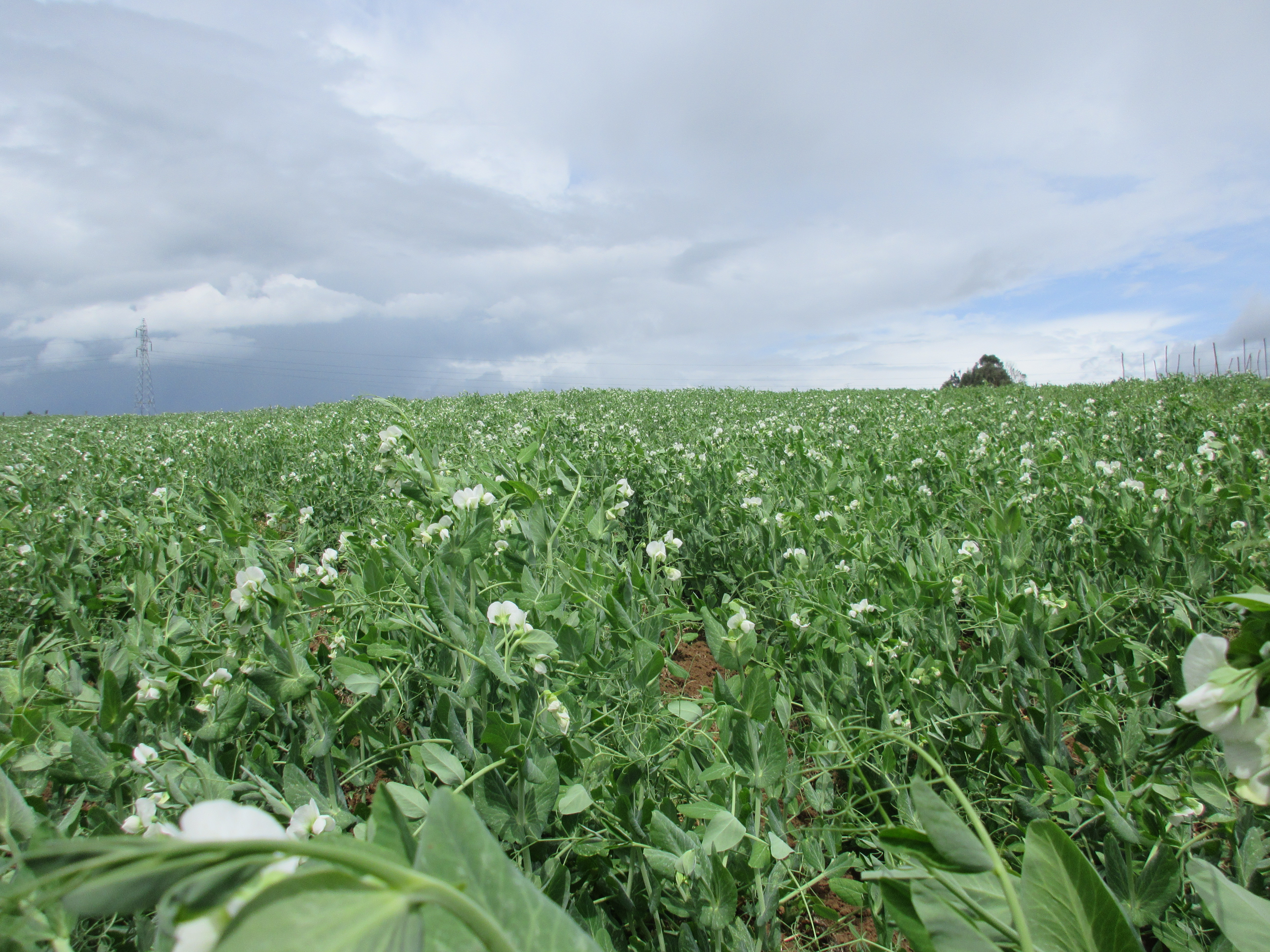
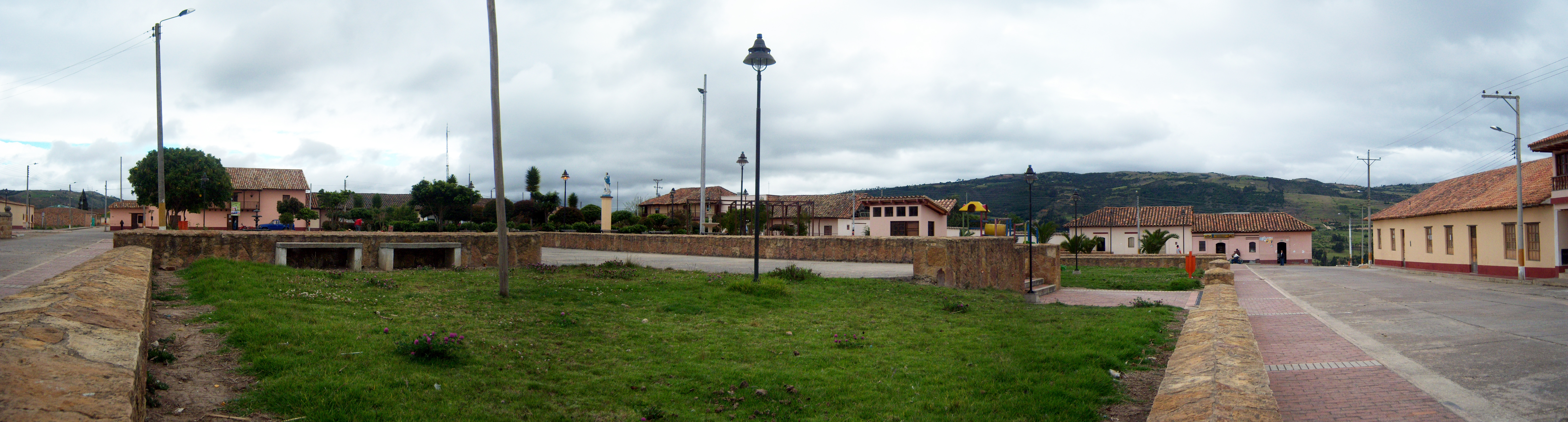
- Oicatá

- Flag Coat of arms

- Location of the municipality and town of Oicatá in Boyacá
- Coordinates: 5°35′41″N 73°18′30″W
- Country: Colombia
- Department: Boyacá Department
- Province: Central Boyacá Province
- Founded: 9 May 1539 ^{(487 Years ago)}
- Founder: Pedro Ruiz Corredor

Government
  - Mayor: Fredy Garzón Rojas (2020-2023)

Area
  - Municipality and town: 59 km^{2} (23 sq mi)
- Elevation: 2,815 m (9,236 ft)

Population (2015)
  - Municipality and town: 2,834
  - Density: 48/km^{2} (120/sq mi)
  - Urban: 301
- Time zone: UTC-5 (Colombia Standard Time)
- Website: Official website

Oicatá is a town and municipality in the Central Boyacá Province, Department of Boyacá, Colombia. The urban centre is situated on the Altiplano Cundiboyacense at an altitude of 2,815 metres (9,236 ft) and a distance of 153 kilometres (95 mi) from the national capital Bogotá and 15 kilometres (9.3 mi) from the department capital Tunja. It borders Cómbita and Tuta in the north, Chivatá and Tunja in the south, Chivatá in the east and in the west Cómbita and Tunja.

== Etymology ==
The name Oicatá comes from Chibcha and means "Domain of the priests" or "Hailstoned farmlands".

== History ==
The municipality was founded on May 9, 1539 by Pedro Ruiz Corredor. Before the Spanish conquest it was the territory of the Muisca, which was the most developed in the country socially, culturally, and in productivity. Post-conquest governmental power was exercised by the Governor General, who was directly appointed by the King of Spain.

After several centuries of Spanish rule, and after fierce battles, the people won their freedom from Spain in the Battle of Boyacá, where on August 7, 1819, troops under the command of Simón Bolívar defeated the Spanish forces.

In 1821 the Constitution of Cúcuta divided the country into departments, the departments into provinces, provinces into counties, and counties into parishes, establishing Boyacá Department as an administrative entity comprising the provinces of Tunja, Pamplona, Socorro and Casanare.

The Act of June 15, 1857, established Boyacá as a sovereign state consisting of the provinces of Tunja, Tundama, Casanare, and the counties of Chiquinquirá and Velez.

The Act of October 31 of that year created four departments: Tunja with 42 districts, Tundama with 46, Casanare with 21, and Oriente (East) with 6.

Under the Constitution of Rionegro in 1863 the administrative divisions of Boyacá underwent various modifications, and Law 10 of that year established a new division into 6 departments: Casanare, Tundama, North, West, East and Centre.

The centrist Constitution of 1886 divided the country into departments, the departments into provinces, and the provinces into municipalities.

The provinces were abolished in 1911 by Executive Decree No. 306, and several municipalities were separated off to form the commissariat of Arauca.

Afterward the municipalities in the Orinoco region formed the intendency of Casanare as a newly annexed territory of Boyacá Department until 1973, when it split off again.

== Economy ==
Main economical activity of Oicatá is agriculture with products potatoes, maize, barley, wheat, peas and beans.

== Climate ==
Oicata's climate is influenced by its location and altitude. At almost 3000 m it is one of the higher cities in Colombia. As a result, the city features a subtropical highland climate (Köppen Cfb) with little variation in temperature throughout the year but a distinct dry season from December to February.

OICATA - 2815 m

Climate chart (precipitation, max. and min. temperature)
| J | F | M | A | M | J | J | A | S | O | N | D |
| 23 19 7 | 30 19 7 | 64 19 8 | 116 18 9 | 108 18 9 | 92 16 8 | 70 16 8 | 69 17 8 | 72 17 8 | 122 17 8 | 108 18 8 | 43 18 7 |
- █ Average max. and min. temperatures in °C
- █ Precipitation totals in mm
- Source: Climate-data.org - Tunja
Imperial conversion
| J | F | M | A | M | J | J | A | S | O | N | D |
| 0.9 66 44 | 1.2 66 45 | 2.5 67 47 | 4.6 65 48 | 4.3 64 48 | 3.6 61 47 | 2.8 61 46 | 2.7 62 46 | 2.8 63 46 | 4.8 63 47 | 4.3 64 47 | 1.7 65 45 |
- █ Average max. and min. temperatures in °F
- █ Precipitation totals in inches

== Gallery ==
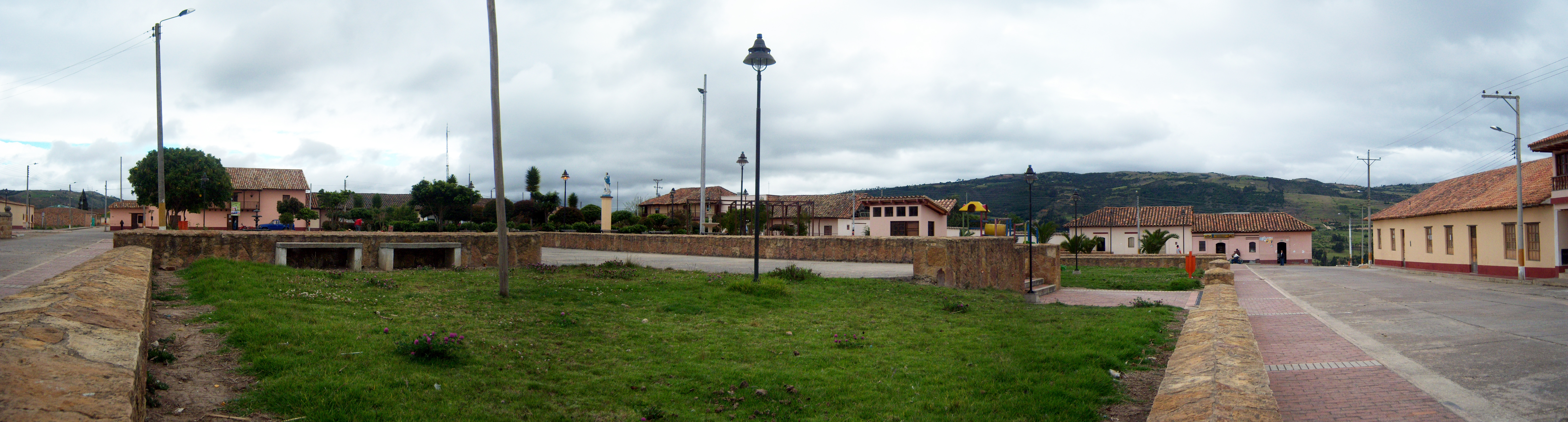
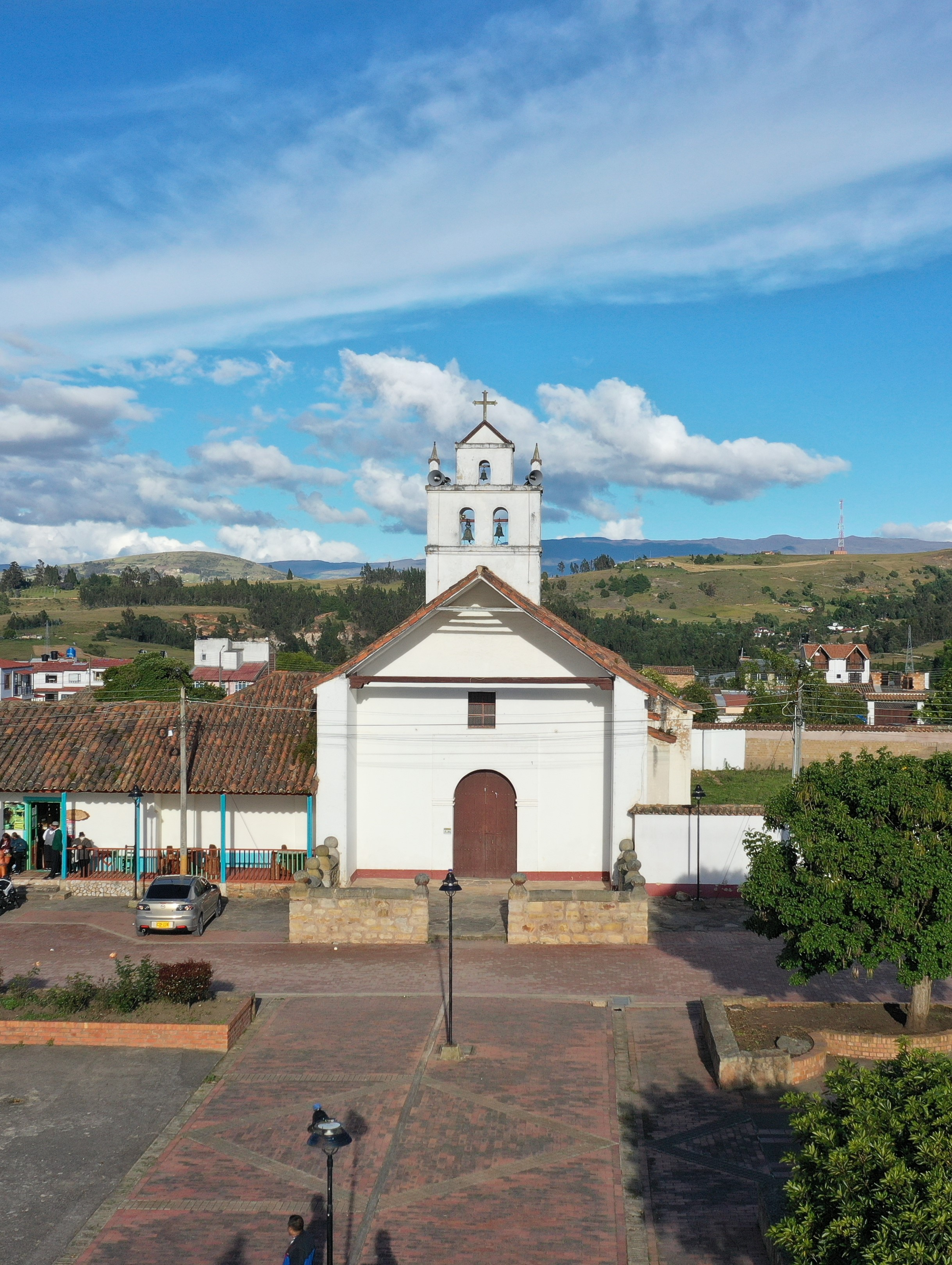
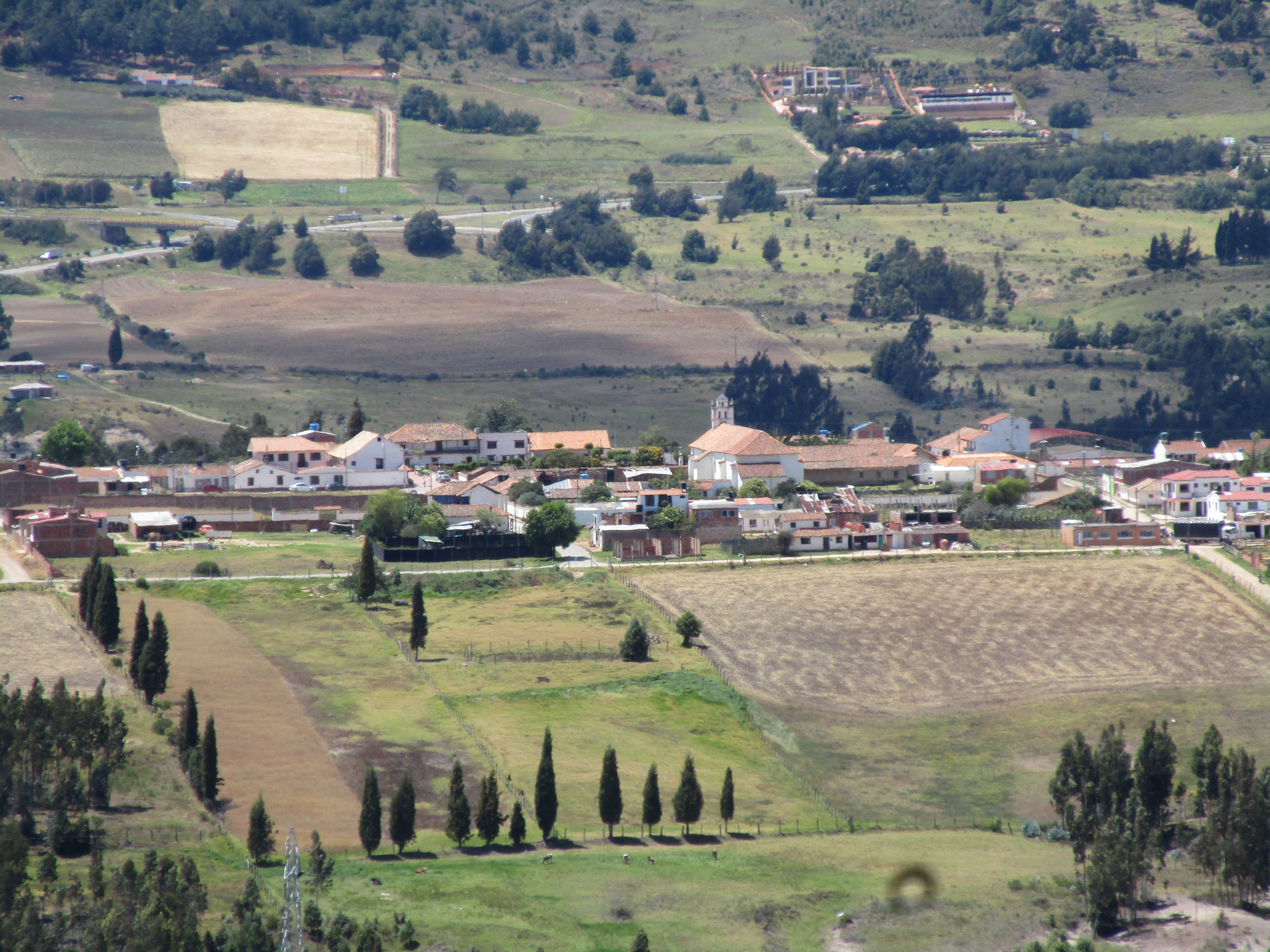
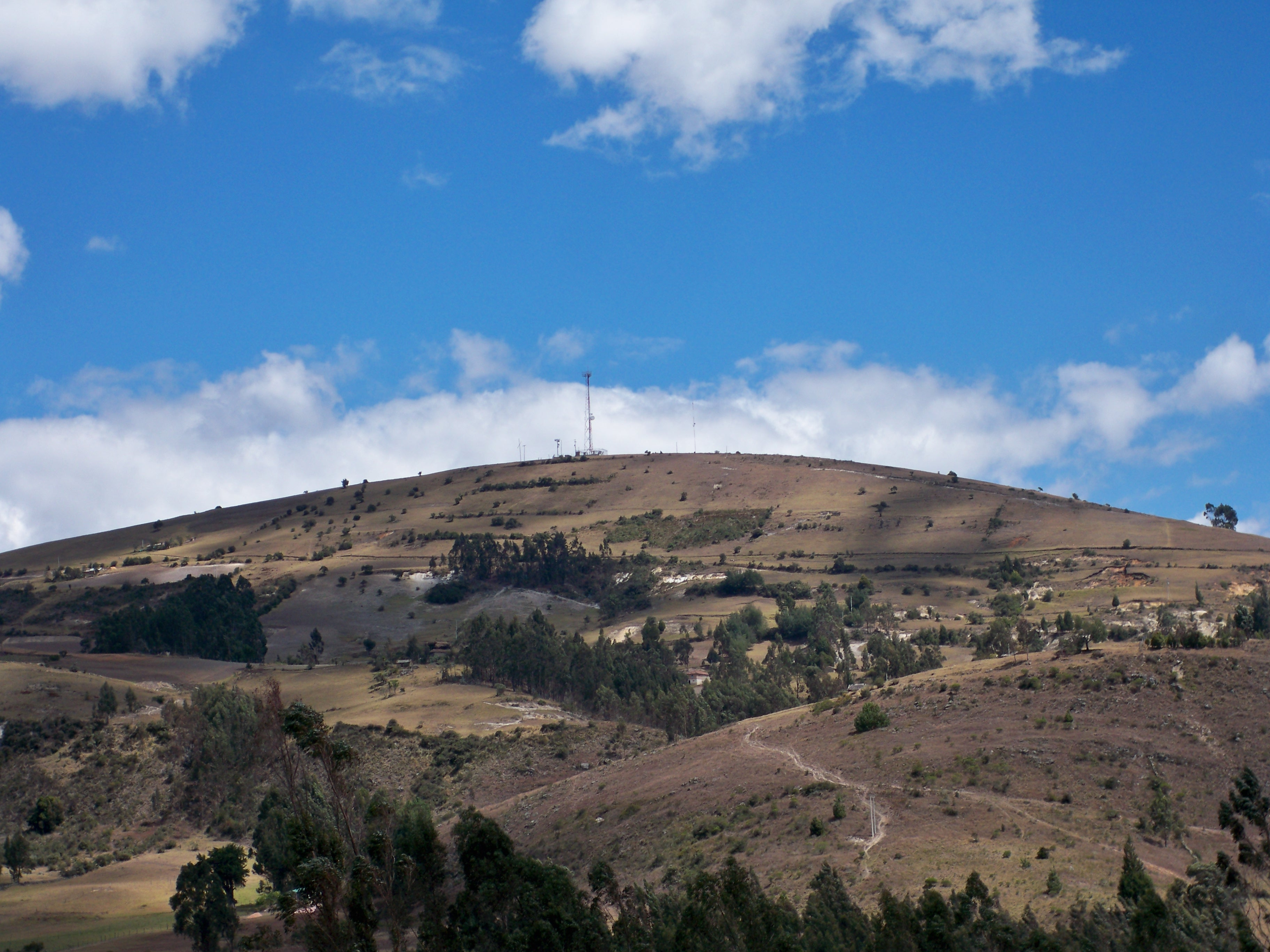
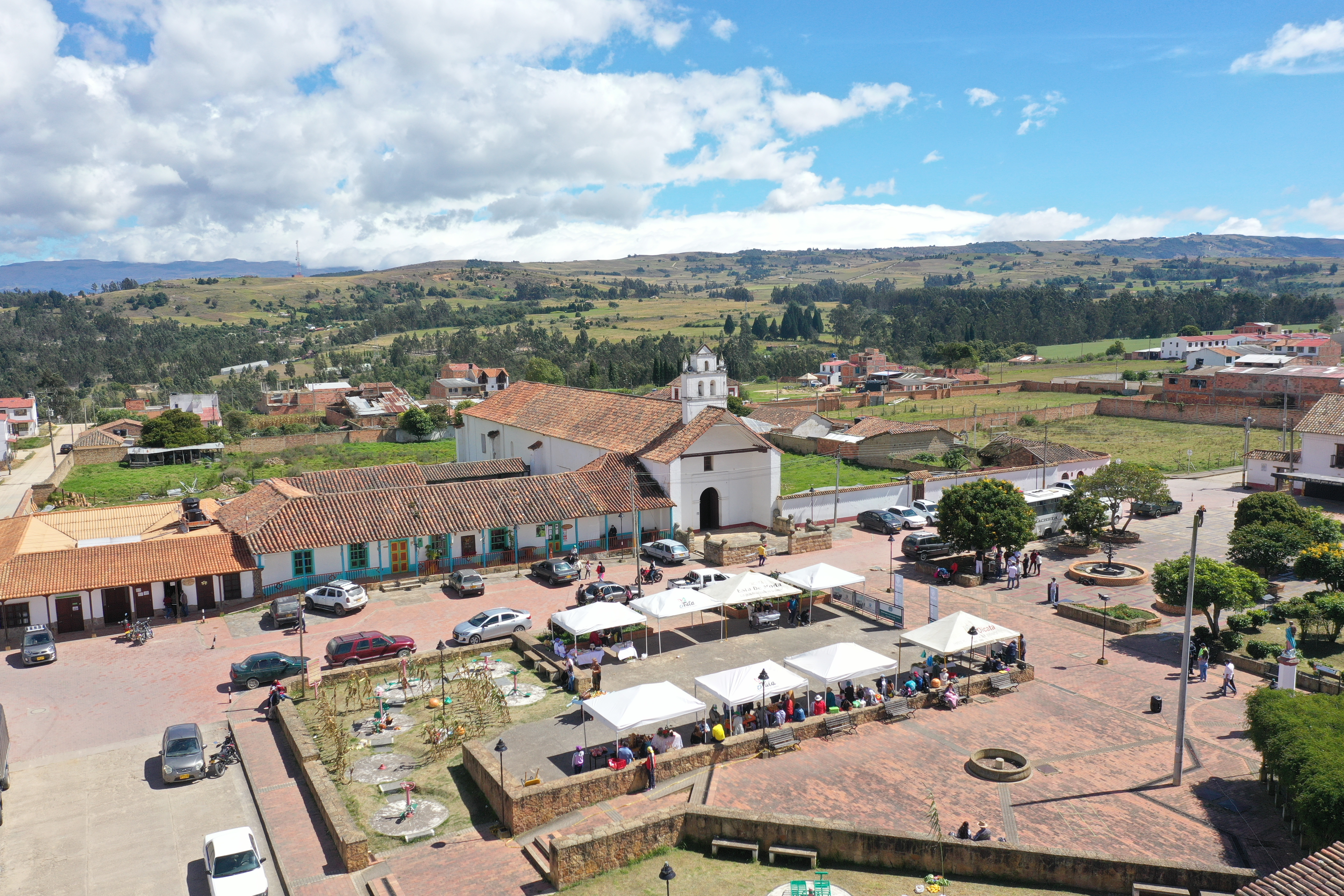
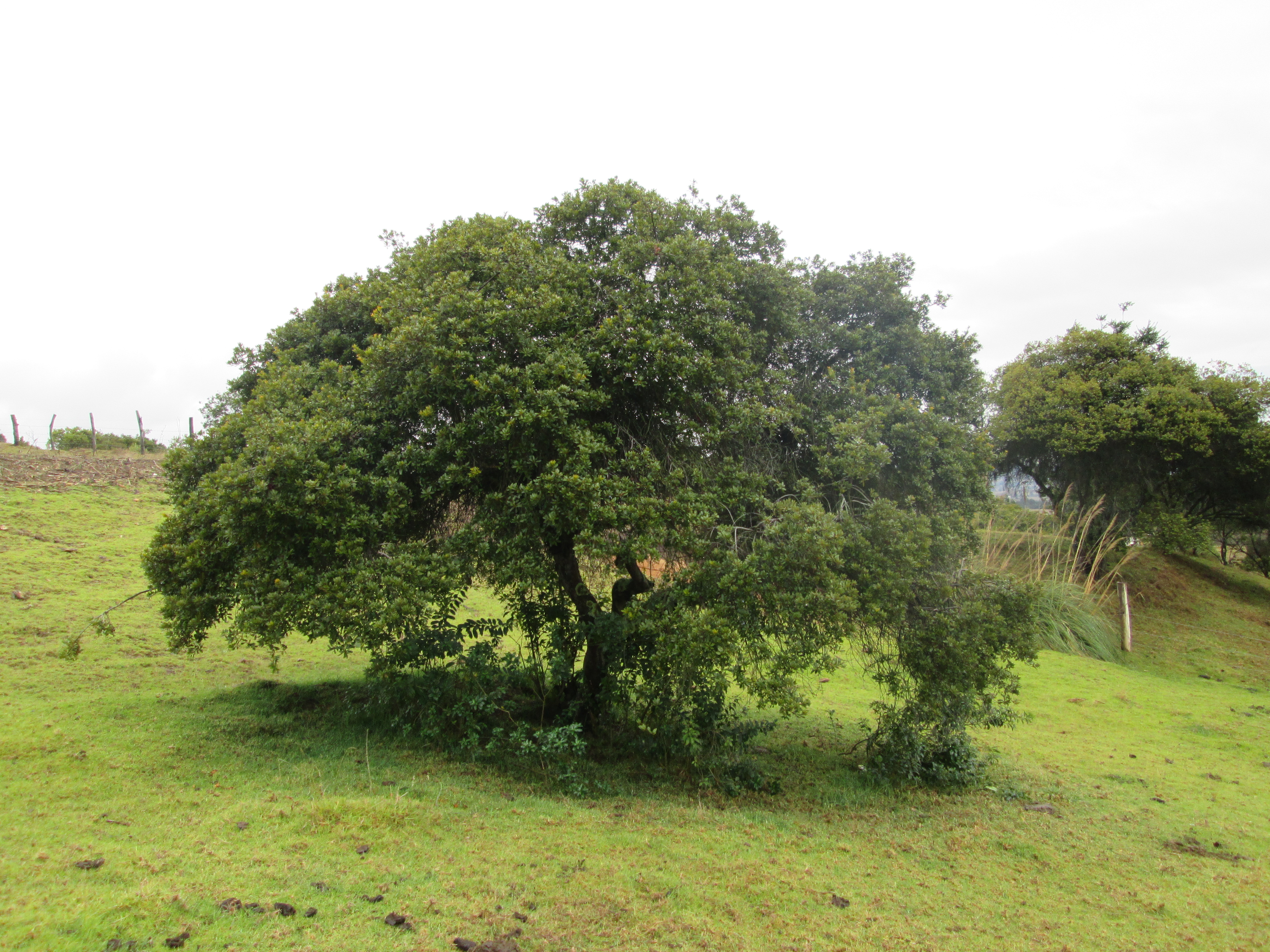
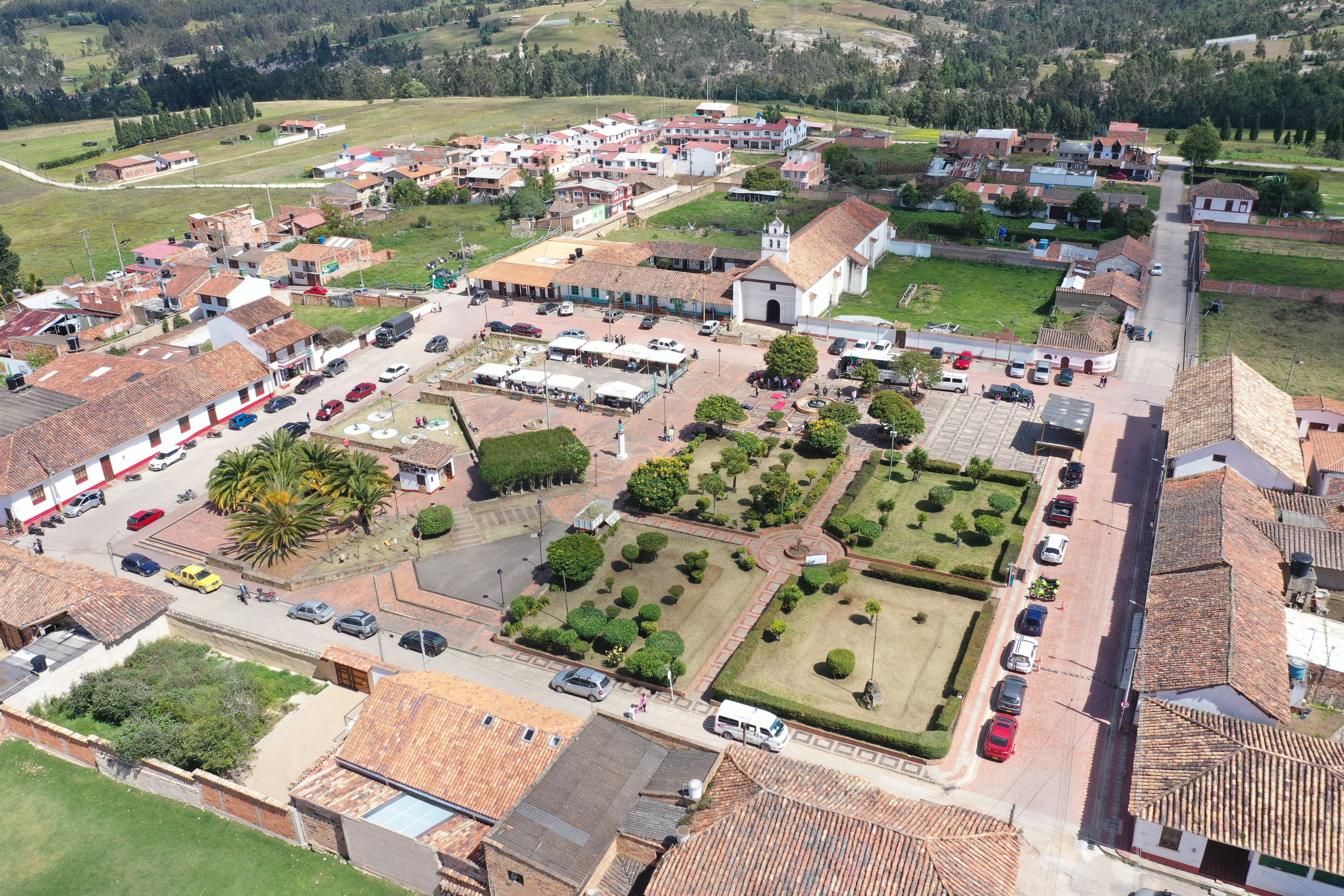
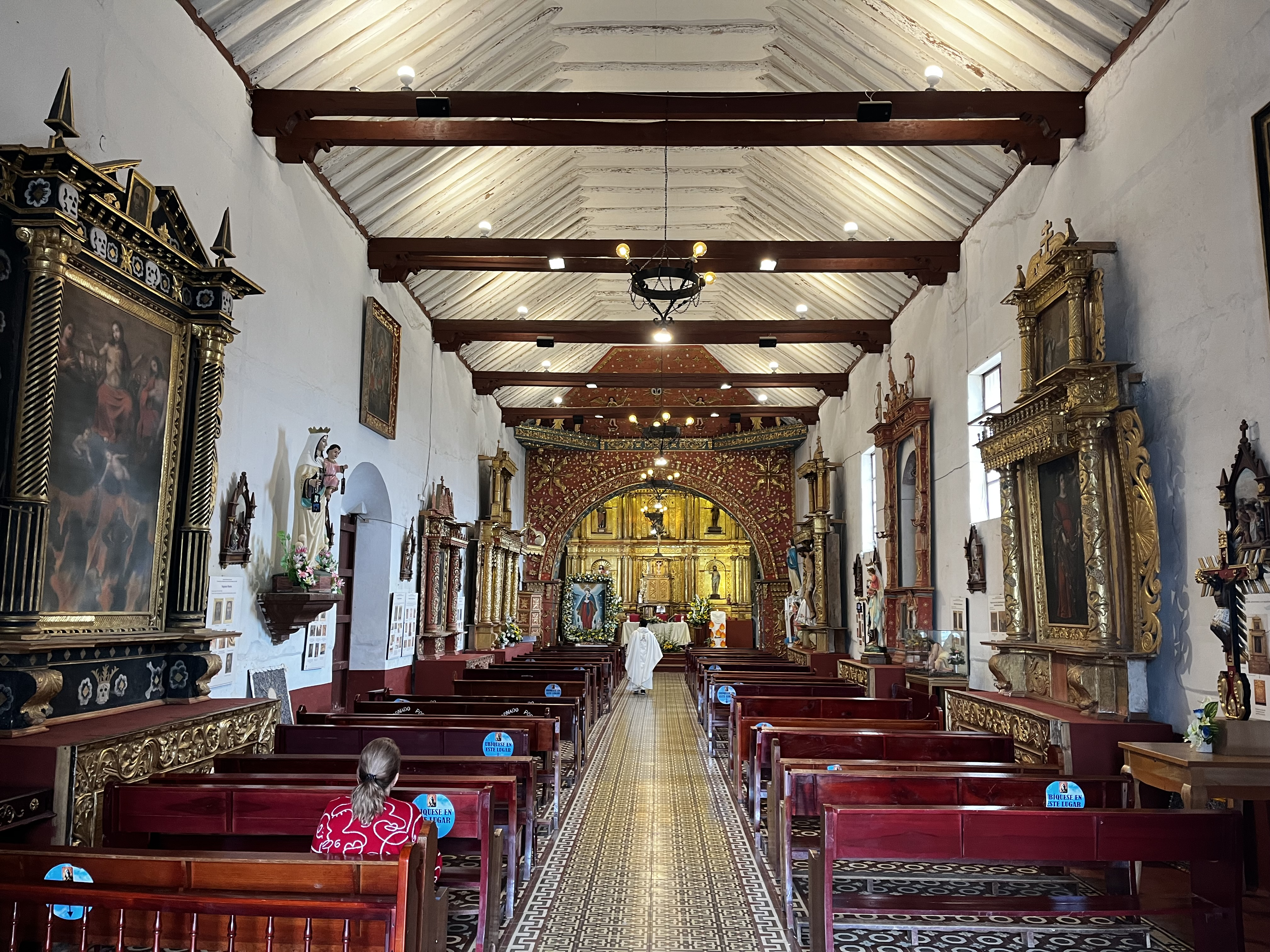
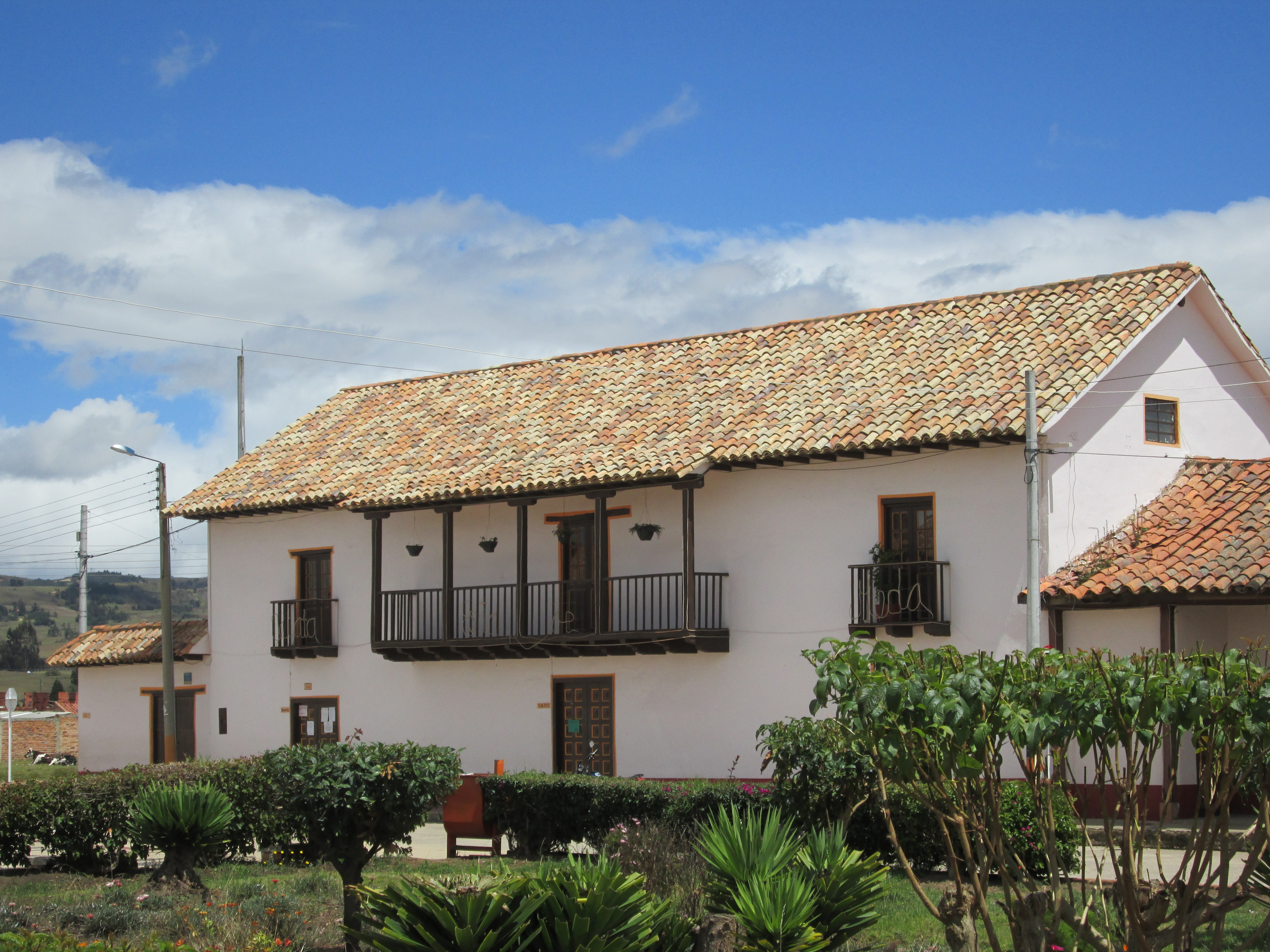
Oicata's Landscapes and buildings
