= Freight broker bond =

A freight broker bond must be obtained by freight brokers and freight forwarders in the United States in order to obtain or renew their license.

In the United States, freight broker surety bonds are required by the Federal Motor Carrier Safety Administration (FMCSA) to move property such as household goods or freight and motor cargo (vehicles). Their role is to guarantee that freight brokers and auto transport brokers will operate according to their agreements with shippers and motor carriers. If a freight broker or auto transport broker does not comply with their contract, the carrier or the shipper may file a claim.

The three parties to the agreement are:

- Principal: the freight broker / auto transport broker
- Obligee: the party requiring the bond (FMCSA)
- Surety: the surety company

A freight broker bond is also known as a BMC-84 surety bond, trucking surety bond, transportation broker surety bond, or property broker bond. FMCSA uses the term "property broker" instead of freight broker.

== History ==
The first freight broker bond requirement came into effect in the 1930. In the 1970s, the bond amount was increased to $10,000 and was not changed until June 29, 2012, when Congress passed the Moving Ahead for Progress in the 21st Century Act (MAP-21).

The two main changes that came with the MAP-21 were:

- the freight broker bond increased from $10,000 to $75,000
- freight forwarders must also meet the $75k requirement

The freight broker bond increase took effect on October 1, 2013. Many freight brokers were against this change because they expected they would not be able to meet the new requirement. It was a 7-fold increase and the previous price had not changed for about 40 years. According to FMCSA, there had been too many cases where shippers and carriers had been delayed (or entirely denied) payment so the bond increase was necessary.

One of the strongest objections to the changes came from the Association of Independent Property Brokers & Agents (AIBPA). It claimed that this would create a loss of 8,200 freight brokerages and tens of thousands of jobs.

Kevin Reid, who was CEO of The National Association for Minority Truckers, also objected, saying it was an "unreasonable barrier to entry for would-be entrepreneurs".

Despite these objections, the provisions were passed into law.
