= Bartolomé Camacho Zambrano =

Spanish conquistador

- Born: 1510; Villafranca de los Barros, Extremadura, Castile
- Died: >1583; Tunja, New Kingdom of Granada
- Occupations: Conquistador
- Years active: 1536-1539
- Employer: Spanish Crown
- Known for: Spanish conquest of the Muisca; Co-founder of Tunja; Quest for El Dorado
- Spouse: Isabel Pérez de Cuéllar
- Children: Elvira Camacho Zambrano; María Zambrana de Cuéllar; Juan Camacho Zambrano; Juana Zambrana; Anastasia Camacho Zambrano; Isabel Camacho Sabidos y Zambrano; Esteban Zambrana
- Parents: Juan Martín Camacho Savidos (father); Elvira Gonzáles Zambrana (mother)
- Relatives: Juan Martín Camacho Sabidos (brother); Pedro Ruíz Corredor (brother-in-law)

Mayor of Tunja
- In office 1583–1583
- Preceded by: Francisco de Velandia & Alonso de Carvajal
- Succeeded by: Diego de Paredes Calderón & Pedro Núñez Cabrera

Bartolomé Camacho Zambrano (1510 – after 1583) was a Spanish conquistador who took part in the expedition of the Spanish conquest of the Muisca led by Gonzalo Jiménez de Quesada. He accompanied Gonzalo Suárez Rendón in the foundation of Tunja on August 6, 1539, and settled in the city. In 1583, Bartolomé Camacho Zambrano was mayor of Tunja together with Francisco de Avendaño.

== Biography ==
Bartolomé Camacho Zambrano was born in 1510 in the Extremaduran village Villafranca de los Barros with parents Juan Martin Camacho Savidos and Elvira Gonzáles Zambrana. He had a brother named Juan Martin Camacho Sabidos. Camacho Zambrano married Isabel Pérez de Cuéllar and the couple had seven children; two sons and five daughters. Isabel's sister Elvira married fellow conquistador Pedro Ruíz Corredor.

== See also ==
- List of conquistadors in Colombia
- Spanish conquest of the Muisca
- El Dorado
- Tunja, Hernán Pérez de Quesada
- Gonzalo Jiménez de Quesada, Gonzalo Suárez Rendón
