= Sponsor (commercial) =

Support of an event, activity, person, or organization financially or through services

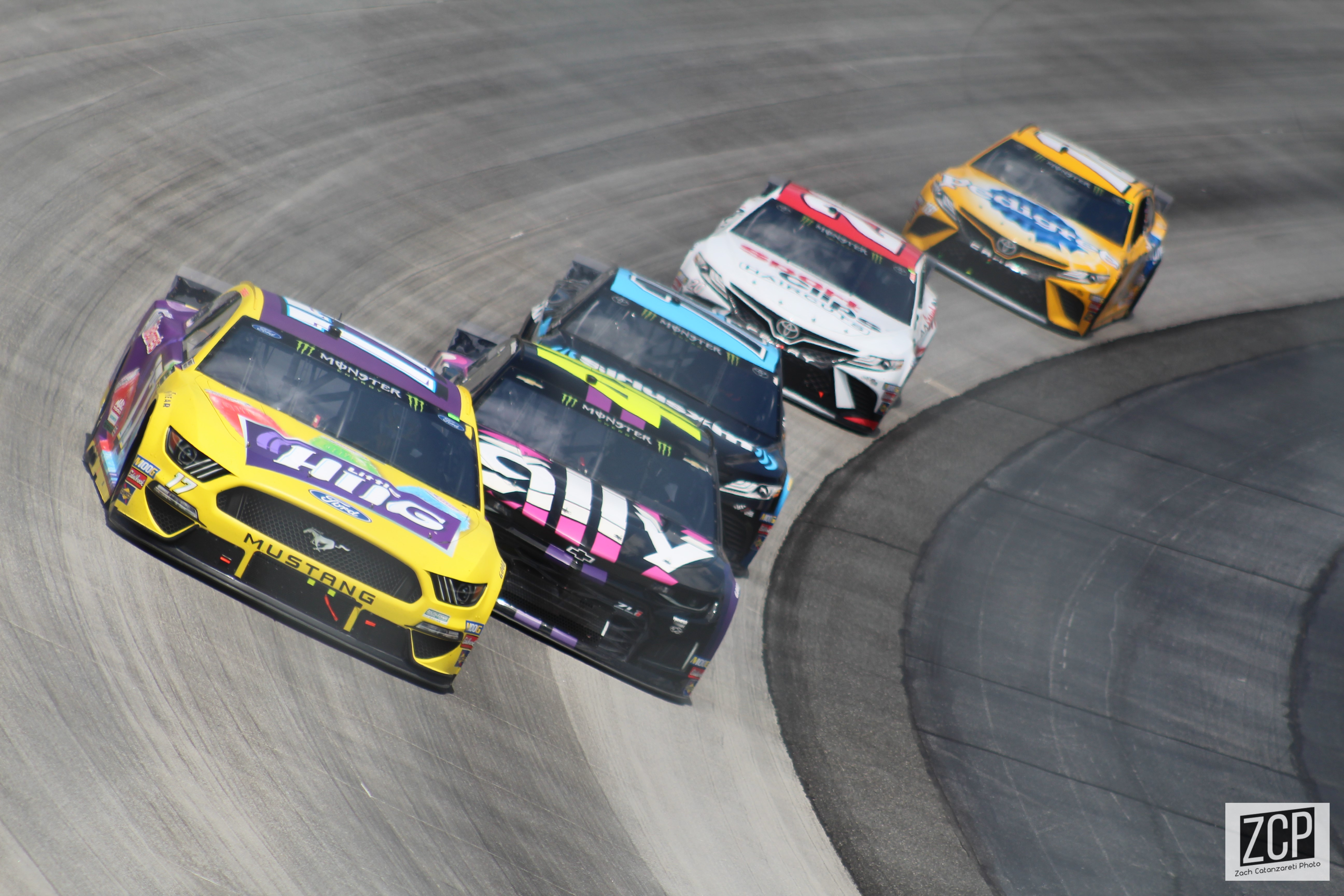
Corporate logos showing NASCAR team sponsors

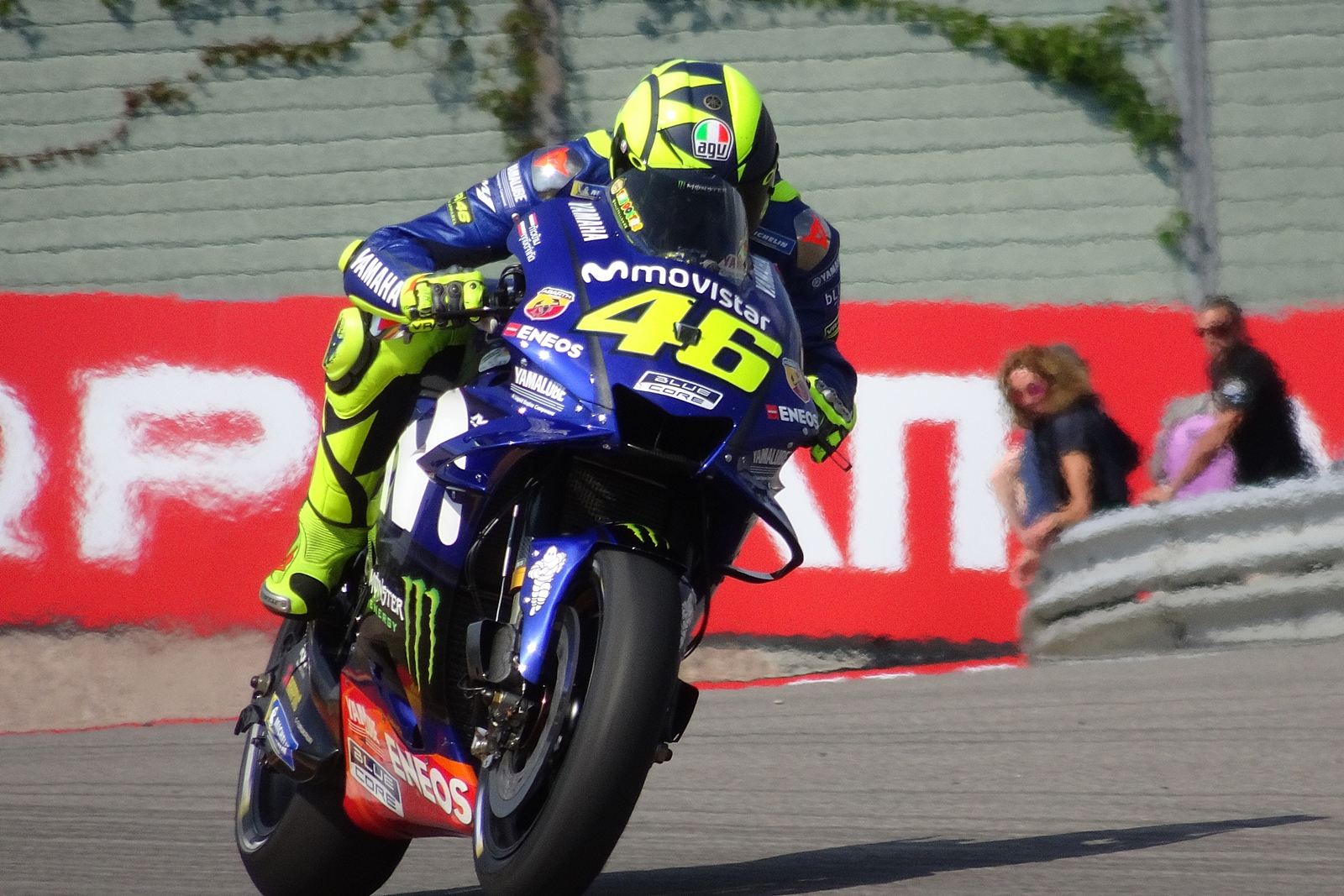
Corporate logos on the circuit and a MotoGP machine

Sponsoring something (or someone) is the act of supporting an event, activity, person, or organization financially or through the provision of products or services. The individual or group that provides the support, similar to a benefactor, is known as the sponsor.

== Definition ==
Sponsorship is a fee—both cash or in-kind—paid to a property (typically in sports, arts, entertainment or causes) in return for access to the exploitable commercial potential associated with that property.

While the sponsee (property being sponsored) may be nonprofit, sponsorship, unlike philanthropy, is done with the expectation of a commercial return.

While sponsorship can deliver increased awareness, brand building and propensity to purchase, it is different from advertising. Unlike advertising, sponsorship can not communicate specific product attributes. Nor can it stand alone, as sponsorship requires support elements.

Proponents of sponsorship would, however, point to its unique position in the marketing mix. A sponsorship program can include all other marketing elements including advertising, promotions, merchandise, hospitality, PR and social media. This allows sponsorship to be used to address a much wider range of business objectives. For example, a sponsor buying the rights to a sports team or competition could achieve increased brand awareness through high profile signage, but might also use hospitality tickets for staff motivation programs or to host key trade customers. On-pack promotions could be linked to the sports property to create a much more compelling consumer proposition and to associate the brand directly with a sports property which has much greater image attributes than the sponsoring brand.

== Theories ==
Various psychological and communication theories have been employed to elucidate the mechanisms by which commercial sponsorship influences consumer audiences. Many theories posit that sponsorship creates a cognitive link between a brand (sponsor) and an event (sponsoree), leading to the formation of event-linked associations in memory. Consequently, thinking of the brand can evoke these associations, influencing consumer perceptions and behaviors. Cornwell, Weeks and Roy (2005) have published an extensive review of the theories so far used to explain commercial sponsorship effects.

One of the most pervasive findings in sponsorship is that the best effects are achieved where there is a logical match between the sponsor and sponsoree, such as a sports brand sponsoring a sports event. Work by Cornwell and colleagues however, has shown that brands that don't have a logical match can still benefit, at least in terms of memory effects, if the sponsor articulates some rationale for the sponsorship to the audience.

== Categories ==
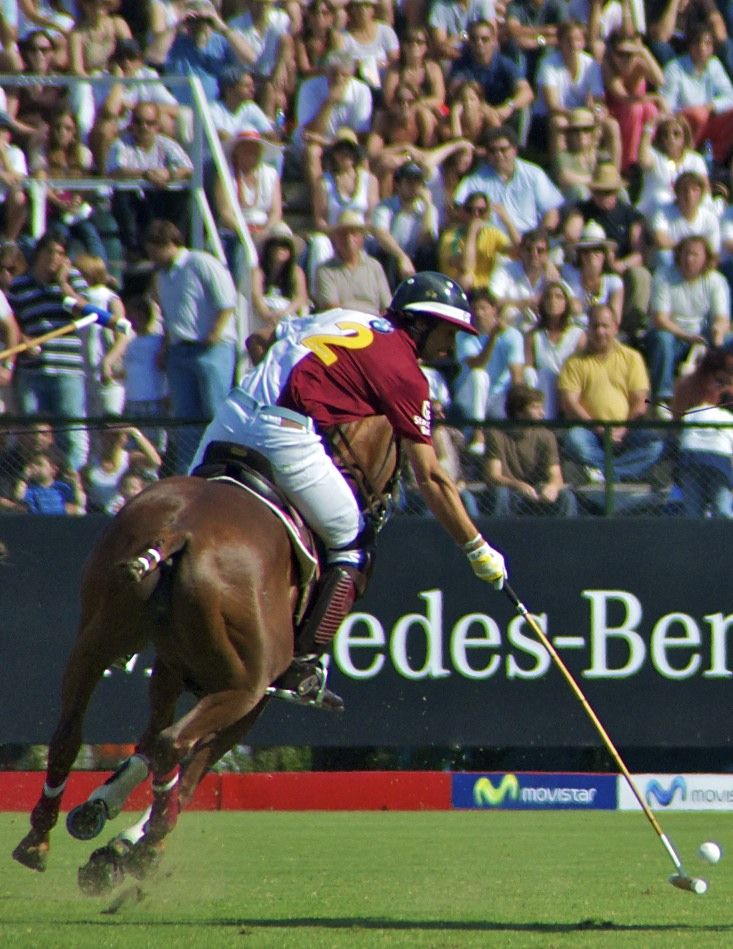
Sponsorship of an automotive company (Mercedes-Benz) in equestrian sports

- Series sponsor is the highest status of sponsorship. Often the name and the logo of the sponsor is incorporated into the title of the series (NASCAR Xfinity Series). This status also allows companies to have a decisive voice on the issue of presence among sponsors of other companies operating in the same business, the priority right to use teams, team members, players, coaches, and the sanctioning body for conducting joint promotions, right of presence at all official events dedicated to a sports event, mandatory mentioning in all activities conducted on behalf of the team, highlighting the name of title sponsor in film credits, television programs which were created with its financial support, placement of logos and banners. Often a patch or sticker is required to placed or worn on a highly visible item (uniform, race car, billboard) of every competitor, even if their personal sponsor is in direct competition with the series sponsor.
- Title sponsor characterizes the most significant contribution to a company in organizing and hosting an event. Often the name of such sponsor is placed next to the name of competition, teams, individual athletes and is associated with it (for example, the logo of a title sponsor is placed in various places around the stadium or track (such as painted in the infield grass / pavement or walls, various places on the field, signboards on the sides of the field, etc.), the name in the title of an auto racing event's official name, or the name of an American football college bowl game). In case of title sponsor's presence, the general sponsor position may remain free.
- General sponsor is a sponsor that makes one of the largest contributions (in absence of a title sponsor – usually more than 50% of all sponsorship funds raised) and that receives for it the right to use the image of competition as well as extensive media coverage. If necessary, the status of the general sponsor may be supplemented by the general sponsors for certain categories, as well as the main sponsor.
- Team sponsor provides funds for individual teams. The more money provided (primary sponsor vs. secondary sponsor), the larger area and more visible location are allocated. In some instances, the team sponsor may be rotated between the primary and secondary sponsor roles. This usually occurs with auto racing teams that travel over a vast area. A team sponsor may take the primary sponsorship role at a race in an area where they are present, such as a store chain. That sponsor may take a secondary sponsorship role, or not even be on the car, in an area they have little or no presence, or are prohibited by law to sell, such as alcohol or tobacco products.
- Official sponsor is a sponsor that makes a certain part of raised funds (within 20–25%). Typically, the given status may be granted by category ("official insurance partner", "official automotive partner", etc.).
- Technical sponsor is a sponsor which promotes organization of sporting events through the partial or full payment of goods and services (e.g., medical equipment, fitness, organization of transportation and lodging).
- Participating sponsor is a company, the sponsorship fee size of which usually does not exceed 10% of total raised funds..
- Informational sponsor is an organization that provides informational support through media coverage, conducting PR-actions, joint actions, etc.

== Principles ==
All sponsorship should be based on contractual obligations between the sponsor and the sponsored party. Sponsors and sponsored parties should set out clear terms and conditions with all other partners involved, to define their expectations regarding all aspects of the sponsorship deal. Sponsorship should be recognisable as such.

The terms and conduct of sponsorship should be based upon the principle of good faith between all parties to the sponsorship. There should be clarity regarding the specific rights being sold and confirmation that these are available for sponsorship from the rights holder. Sponsored parties should have the absolute right to decide on the value of the sponsorship rights that they are offering and the appropriateness of the sponsor with whom they contract.

=== Selling ===
The sales cycle for selling sponsors is often a lengthy process that consists of researching prospects, creating tailored proposals based on a company's business objectives, finding the right contacts at a company, getting buy-in from multiple constituencies and finally negotiating benefits/price. Some sales can take up to a year and sellers report spending anywhere between 1–5 hours researching each company that is viewed as a potential prospect for sponsorship.

=== Leveraging and activation ===
These are the terms used by many sponsorship professionals, which refer to how a sponsor uses the benefits they are allocated under the terms of a sponsorship agreement. Leveraging has been defined by Weeks, Cornwell and Drennan (2008) as "the act of using collateral marketing communications to exploit the commercial potential of the association between a sponsor and sponsee" while activation has been defined as those "communications that promote the engagement, involvement, or participation of the sponsorship audience with the sponsor."

Money spent on activation is over and above the rights fee paid to the sponsored property and is often far greater than the cost of the rights fee."

== Sponsorship markets ==
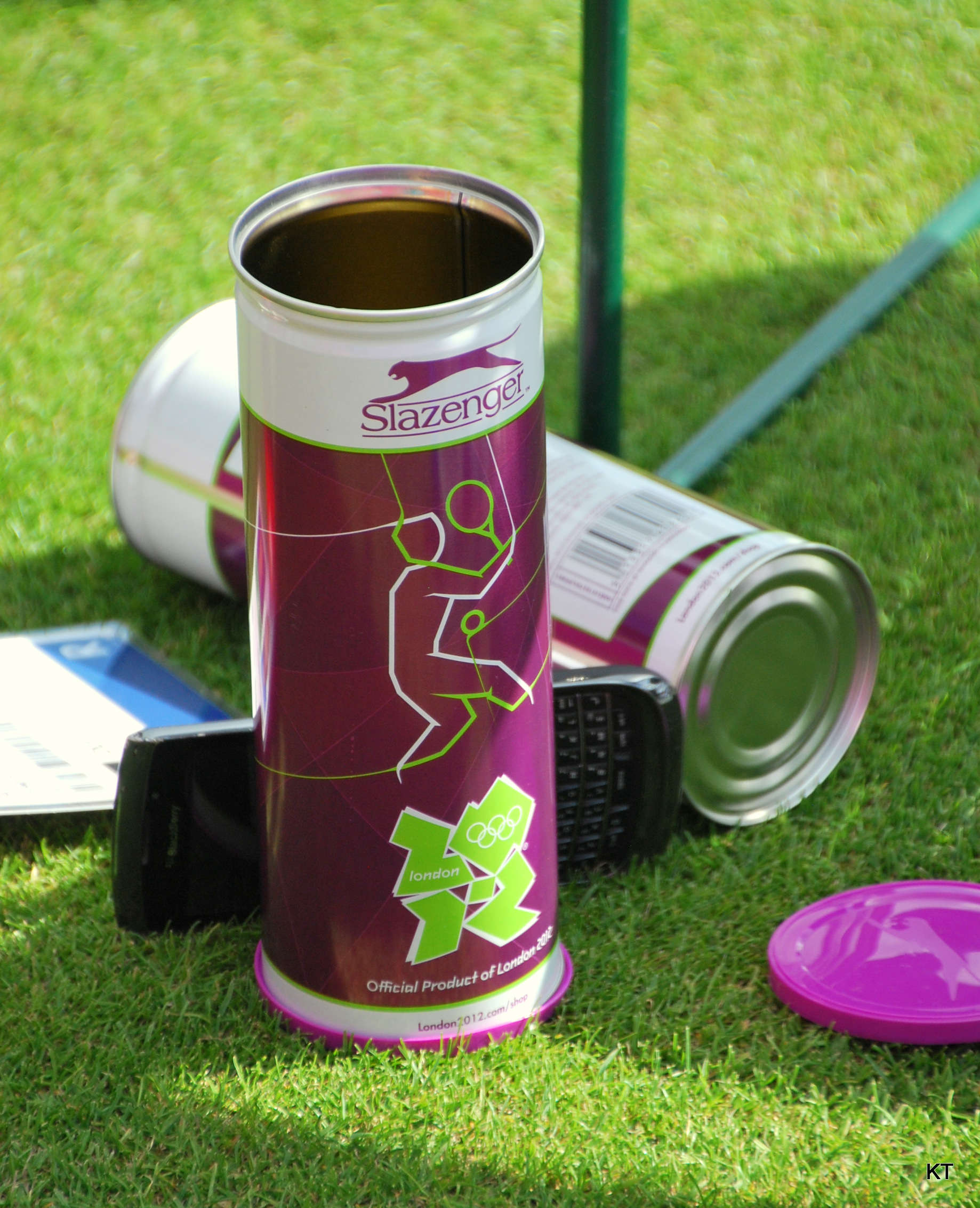
Slazenger has the longest sponsorship in sport, supplying tennis balls to Wimbledon since 1902.

IEG projects spending on sponsorship globally to grow 4.5 percent in 2018 to $65.8 billion, including $24.2 billion in North America alone (a 4.5% increase from $24.1 billion in 2017). Europe is the largest source of sponsorship spending, with €26.44 million (US$29 million) in just the EU member states in 2014, followed by North America, the Asia Pacific region. Growth in Central and South America during 2010 did not materialize to the extent projected—3.8 percent versus a forecast of 5.7 percent—despite the FIFA World Cup and Olympic Games in Brazil in 2014 and 2016, respectively. With the 2010 World Cup concluded, sponsorship activity should begin to heat up, thus the region is projected to be the fastest-growing source of sponsorship dollars outside North America, with a forecast growth rate of 5.6 percent for 2011.

Relaxed television industry legislation surrounding product placement has led to a small but increasing rise in TV programming sponsorship in the UK. However, commercial sponsorship of British sports teams and players is a multibillion-pound industry. For example, Adidas became the sponsor and supplier of Manchester United's kit for ten seasons, in a 2014 deal with a guaranteed minimum value of £750 million (more than US$1.1 billion).

As it has in most years over the past two-plus decades, sponsorship's growth rate will be ahead of the pace experienced by advertising and sales promotion, according to IEG.

== See also ==
- Advertising
- Ambush marketing
- Cause marketing
- Donation
- Influencer marketing
- List of advertising technology companies
- Marketing
- Naming rights
- Sponsorship broker
- Sports marketing
- Sustaining program
