= Pedro Ruíz Corredor =

Spanish conquistador

- Died: After 1601
- Occupations: Conquistador
- Years active: 1533–1548
- Employer: Spanish Crown
- Known for: Conquest of the Muisca; Conquest of the Inca
- Spouse: Elvira Pérez de Cuéllar
- Children: María Ruíz Corredor
- Relatives: Miguel Ruíz Corredor (brother)

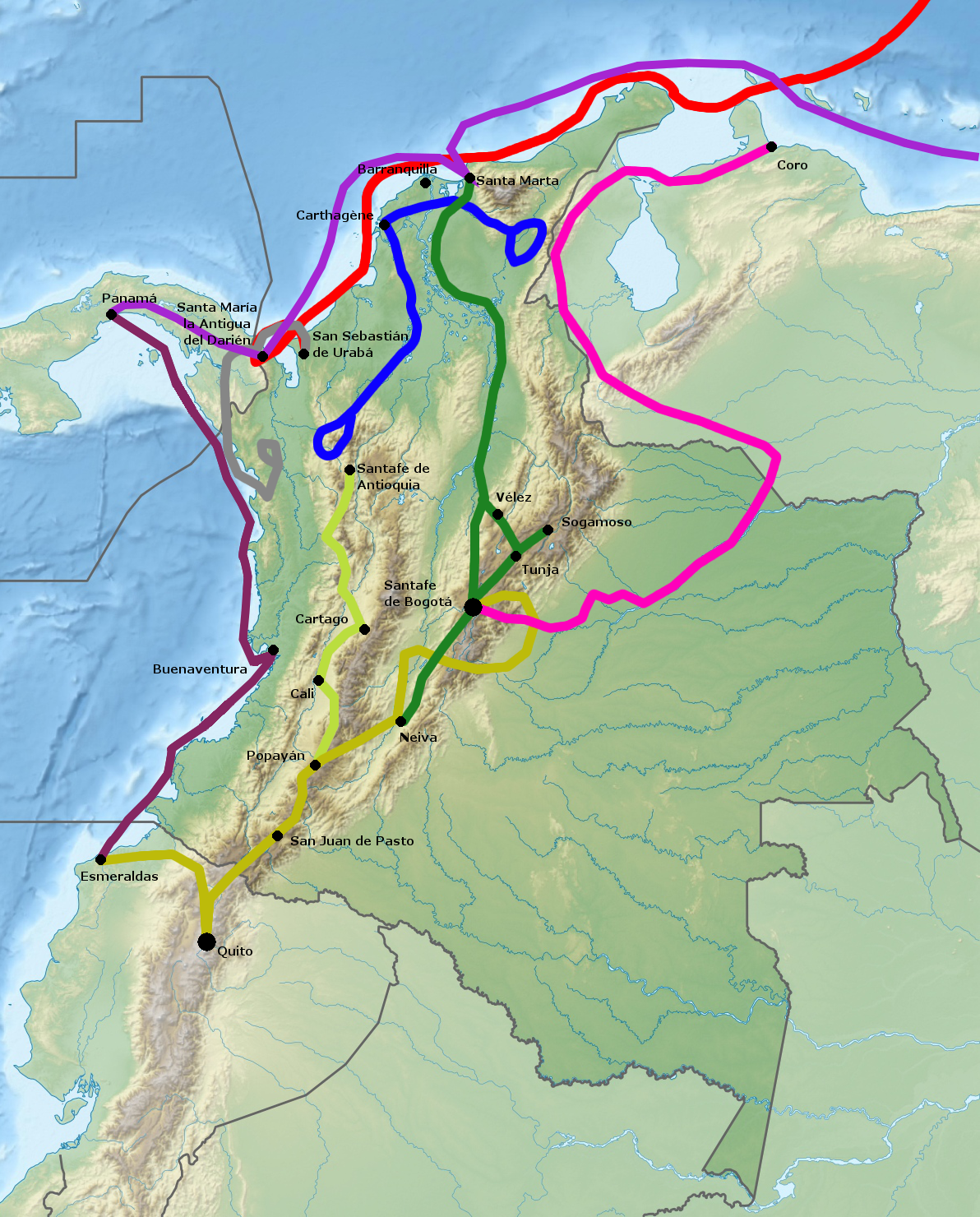
Pedro Ruiz Corredor was one of the soldiers in the expedition along the green route from Santa Marta into the Muisca Confederation

Pedro Ruíz Corredor (d. after 1601) was a Spanish conquistador who participated in the Spanish conquest of the Muisca. He searched for El Dorado, returned to Spain, was sent back to the new world, helped consolidate newly conquered Peru for Spain, retired to his fiefdom to raise a family, and lived to a ripe old age.

== Biography ==
=== El Dorado ===
The origins of Pedro Ruíz Corredor are unknown. He arrived from Spain in Santa Marta in 1533. Ruíz Corredor joined the expedition of Gonzalo Jiménez de Quesada in the quest for El Dorado, leaving Santa Marta in April 1536. Ruíz Corredor received the encomienda of Oicatá and Nemuza. His brother Miguel was mayor of Tunja in 1591 and 1598.

=== Peru ===
Pedro Ruíz Corredor returned to Spain with the valuables he had obtained in the New Kingdom of Granada. In 1548 he was sent to Peru, where he assisted the troops of Pedro de la Gasca and Gonzalo Pizarro. In June 1570, Ruíz Corredor was back in Oicatá and ordered the Muisca of his encomienda, and the villages of Chivatá, Motavita, Suta, Cómbita and Moniquirá to construct acequias, channels for the drainage of the lands. In 1601 Ruíz Corredor is mentioned as he having promised to pay the native people in his encomienda 200 cotton mantles, but only supplying half of that.

=== Personal life ===
Pedro Ruíz Corredor married Elvira Pérez de Cuéllar and the couple had one daughter; María Ruíz Corredor. Elvira's sister Isabel was married to Bartolomé Camacho Zambrano, a fellow conquistador in Colombia. The place and year of his death are unknown.

== Encomienda ==
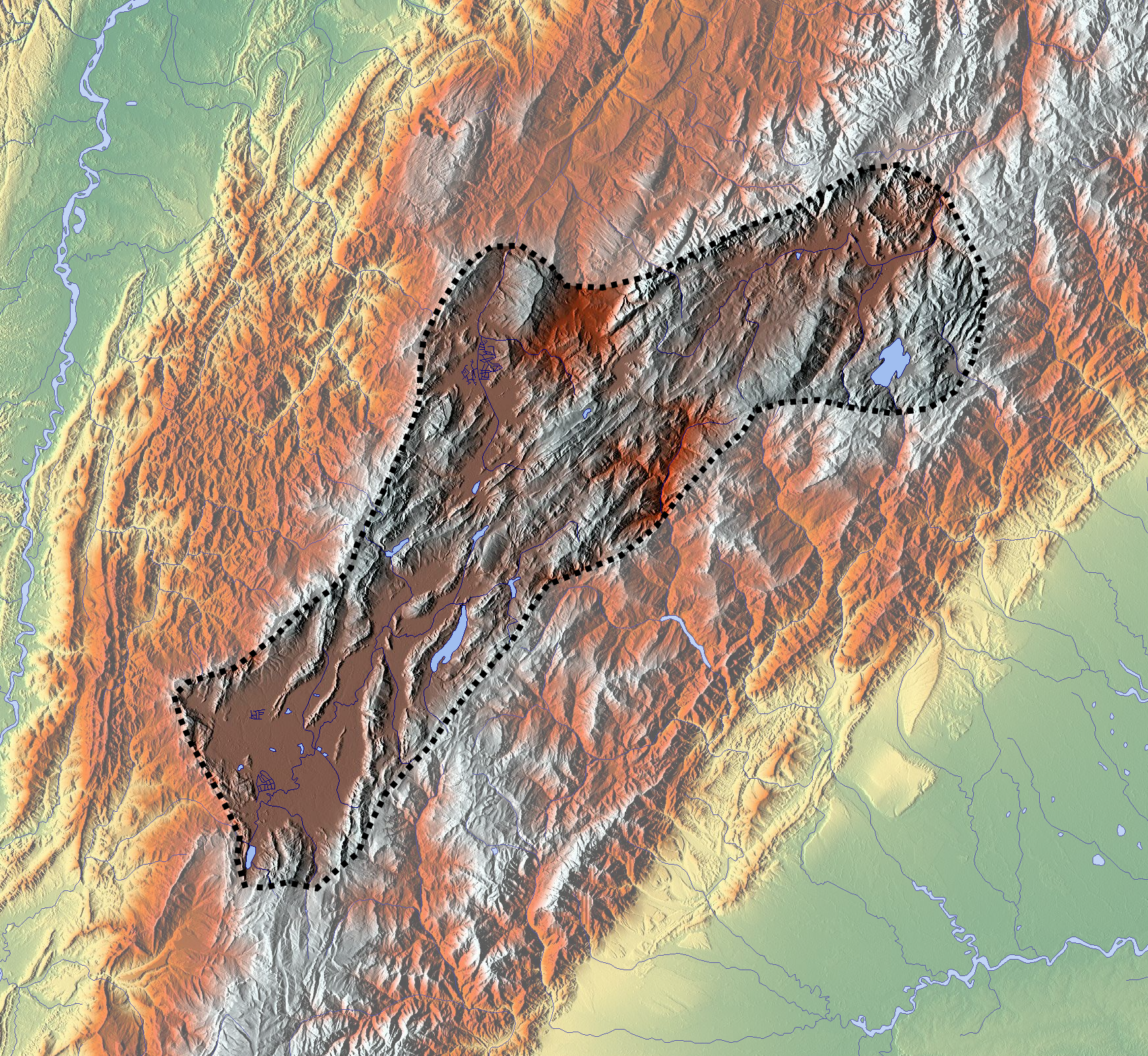
Encomienda of Ruíz Corredor on the Altiplano Cundiboyacense

== See also ==
- List of conquistadors in Colombia
- Spanish conquest of the Muisca
- Spanish conquest of the Inca Empire, Hernán Pérez de Quesada
- Gonzalo Jiménez de Quesada

== Bibliography ==
- Gaviria Liévano, Enrique (2002), El liberalismo y la insurrección de los artesanos contra el librecambio: primeras manifestaciones socialistas en Colombia, Universidad Jorge Tadeo Lozano, pp. 1–318, ISBN 978-958-9029-49-7
- Jaramillo Uribe, Jaime (1964), La población indígena de Colombia en el momento de la conquista y sus transformaciones posteriores (PDF), Universidad Nacional de Colombia, pp. 239–293
- Muñoz Cárdenas, Felipe Andrés (2014), La Administración de Tunja a través del siglo XX – The Administration of Tunja through the twentieth century (PDF), Universidad Nacional de Colombia, pp. 1–163, archived from the original (PDF) on 2017-03-09
