= Josep Maria Corredor i Pomés =

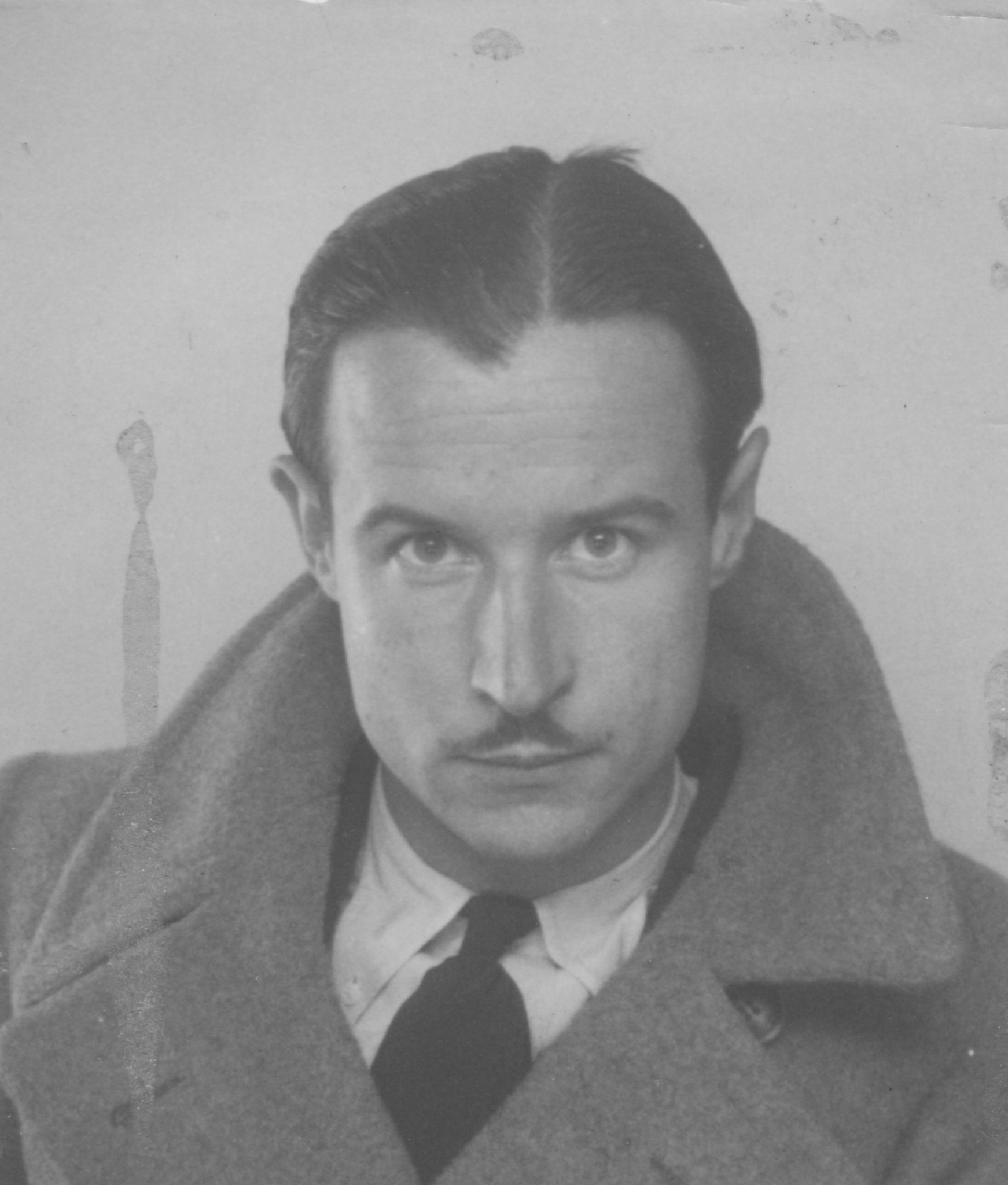
Josep Maria Corredor

Josep Maria Corredor (Catalan pronunciation: [ʒuˈzɛb məˈɾi.ə kurəˈðo]; 3 June 1912 – 29 September 1981) was a Catalan writer, translator, teacher and cultural activist.

== Life ==
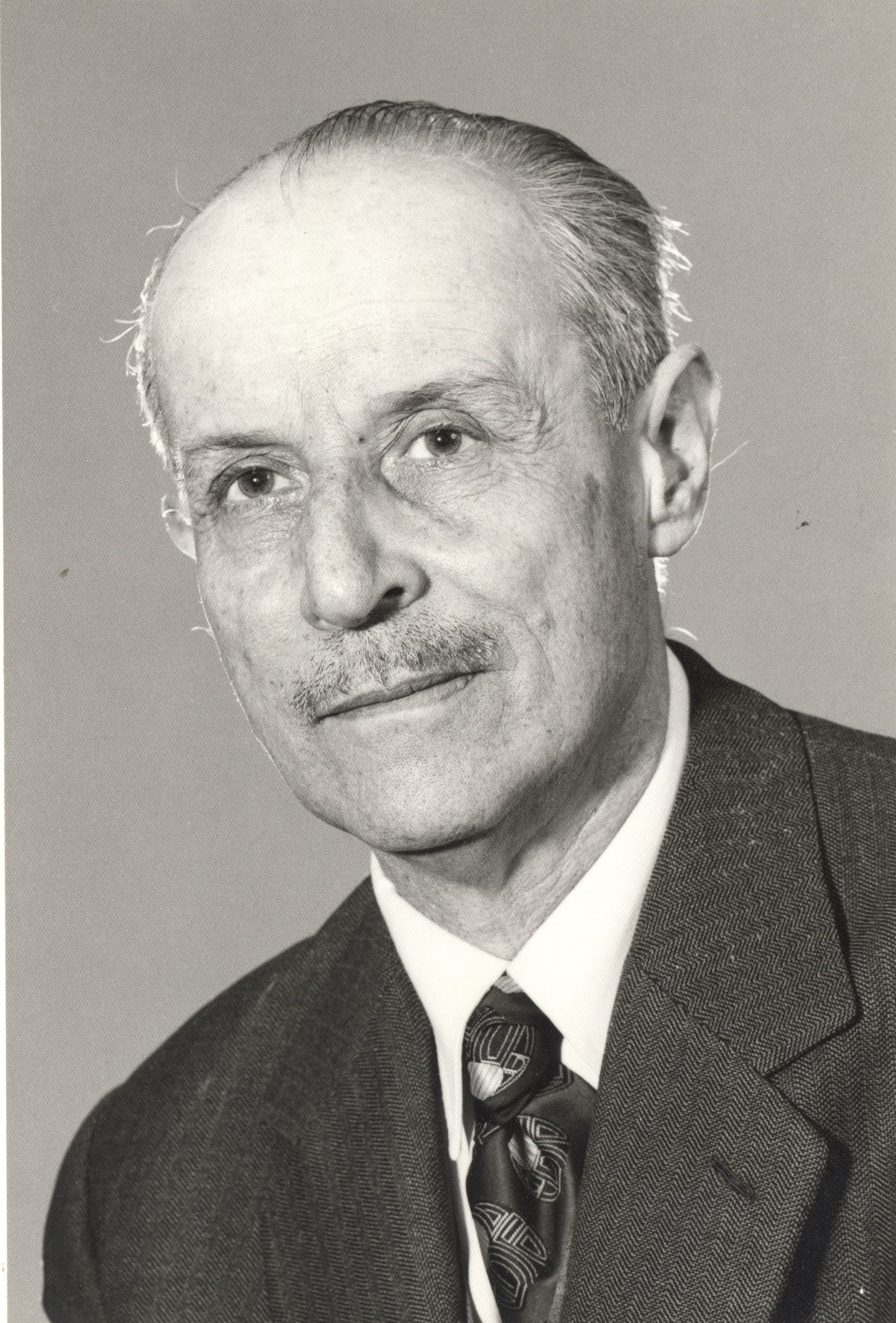
Josep Maria Corredor

Born on 3 June 1912 in Girona, he was the youngest of the three sons of Manuel Corredor and Serafina Pomés. After the proclamation of the second Spanish Republic he joined the progressive and intellectual movements of his city and started to write in the local press. After studying to become a school teacher in Girona he moved first to Madrid and then to Barcelona to study philosophy. At the outbreak of the Civil War in 1936 he had to interrupt his studies and join the army. At the end of the War and with the republicans defeated, Corredor went into exile in Montpellier and finished his studies at the University there. When the Second World War ended he settled in the French Catalan city of Perpignan where he was married, had a daughter and started a prolific career as a cultural activist. Shortly he met the main figures from the Catalan exile such as Pompeu Fabra, Antoni Rovira i Virgili and Pablo Casals to whom Corredor became personal secretary. As a result of his relationship with the cellist, in 1955 appeared the book Conversations avec Pablo Casals: souvenirs et opinions d'un musicien. The book was an instant success and it was edited and translated to several languages. Josep Maria Corredor was also the catalyst for an international campaign to build a tomb for the Spanish poet Antonio Machado in Collioure. During the 1960s Corredor resumed his collaborations with the Catalan press and following the death of the dictator Francisco Franco he returned to Girona. However, the Spanish transition to democracy disappointed him and he found himself out of place. On 29 September 1981 Corredor committed suicide in Perpignan, where he is buried. He was 69 years old.

== Work ==
- Joan Maragall. Un esprit méditerranéen (1951).
- Conversations avec Pablo Casals (1954)
