= Diego Guerrero =

Venezuelan footballer (born 1986)

Personal information
- Date of birth: 26 June 1986 (age 40)
- Place of birth: San Cristóbal, Venezuela
- Height: 1.75 m (5 ft 9 in)
- Position: Defensive midfielder

Team information
- Current team: Aragua
- Number: 5

Senior career*
| Years | Team | Apps | (Gls) |
| 2006–2007 | Loteria del Táchira | 0 | (0) |
| 2007–2009 | Deportivo Táchira | 32 | (1) |
| 2009 | Monagas | 11 | (0) |
| 2010 | Real Esppor | 11 | (0) |
| 2010–2012 | Deportivo Táchira | 63 | (1) |
| 2012–2015 | Deportivo La Guaira | 49 | (1) |
| 2015–2016 | Atlético Venezuela | 49 | (0) |
| 2017 | Deportivo La Guaira | 11 | (0) |
| 2017 | Deportivo Anzoátegui | 11 | (1) |
| 2018– | Aragua | 5 | (0) |

International career^{‡}
| 2012– | Venezuela | 1 | (0) |
- * Club domestic league appearances and goals as of 23 May 2018 ‡ National team caps and goals as of 6 April 2012

Diego Guerrero (born 26 June 1986) is a Venezuelan international footballer who plays for Aragua FC, as a defensive midfielder.

== Career ==
Born in San Cristóbal, Guerrero has played club football for Loteria del Táchira, Deportivo Táchira, Monagas and Real Esppor.

He made his international debut for Venezuela in 2012.
