= Meat science =

Study of meat

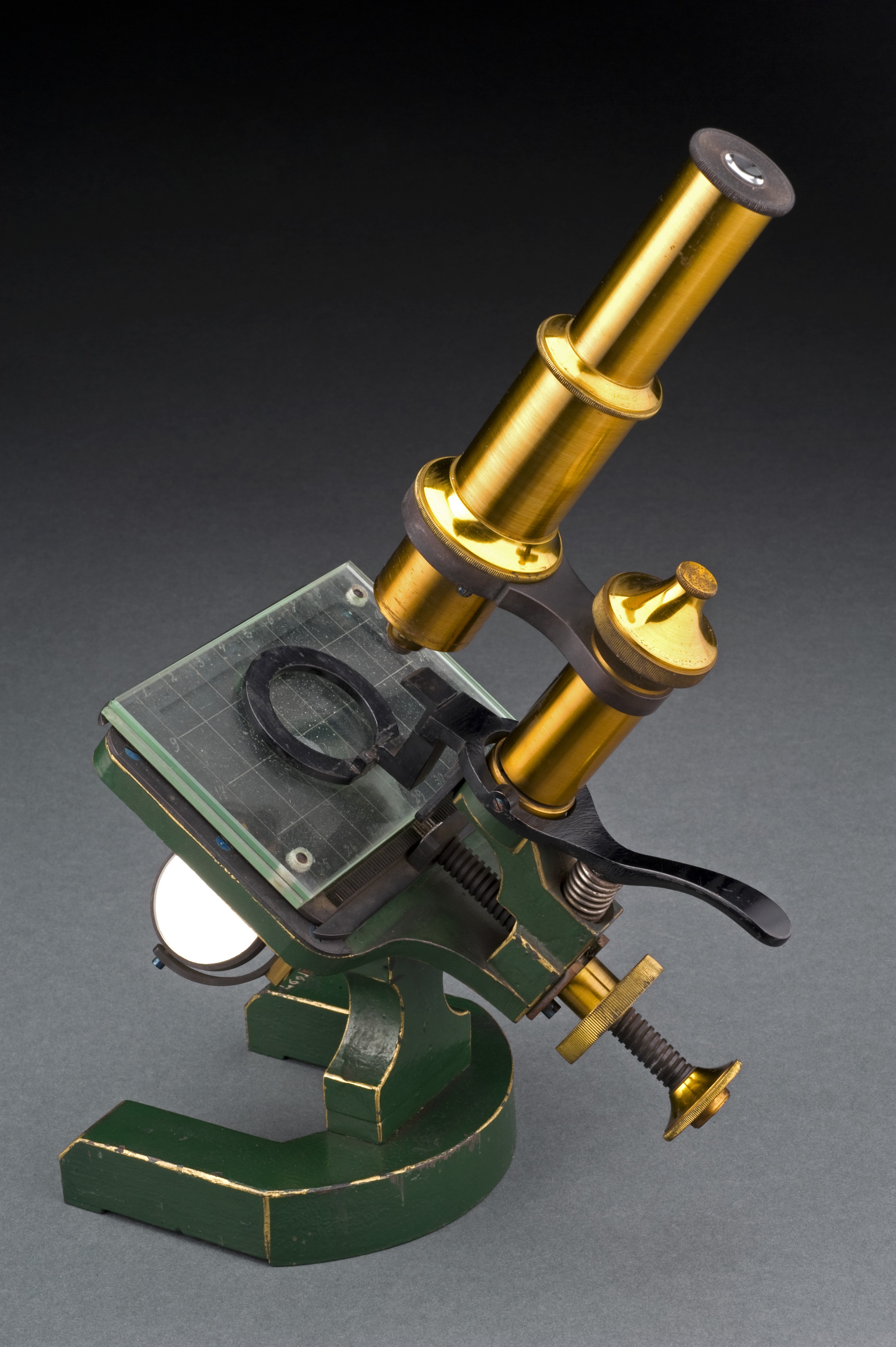
A microscope used to inspect meat in France in the 19th century

Meat science is the study of meat, including its production, preparation and preservation. Some meat scientists are studying methods of producing artificial meat such as cultures of muscle cells.

== Drip loss ==
Drip loss is the leakage of myofibers and loss of iron, protein, and water during the transition of muscle to meat. Drip loss impacts the quality and palatability of meat, and has been an issue for pork and chicken. Drip loss is in part governed by the water holding capacity of meat.

== See also ==
- Flavorist
