= Sponsorship broker =

Individual or agency that secures funding for properties

A sponsorship broker is an individual, or agency, that procures sponsorship funding for properties (defined as an outlet with a captive audience that provides for a positive experience). Sponsorship brokers tend to specialize to particular niches within the sponsorship-marketing field.

A typical sponsorship could be, for example, an arrangement to exchange advertising for the responsibility of providing funding for a popular event or entity. For example, a corporate entity may provide equipment for a famous band in exchange for brand recognition. The sponsor earns popularity this way while the sponsored can earn a lot of money and/or receive free music equipment. This type of sponsorship is prominent in the sports, arts, media and charity sectors.

== See also ==
- Donation
- Cause marketing
- Ambush marketing
- Sports marketing
- Sustaining program
