= Weight fraud =

Mislabeling of a product's weight

Weight fraud (also scale fraud and short-weighting) is a type of measurement fraud involving the mislabeling or inaccurate weighing of products. In this deceptive practice, products are labeled or weighed in a manner that falsely indicates a greater weight than they actually possess. For fraud deterrence, many locales require periodic calibration of weight scales and employ inspectors to verify that the legal standard definitions of weights are being met.

The rise of self-checkout has led to consumer weight fraud at the register resulting in shrinkage. Customers may intentionally or unintentionally misrepresent the weight of products when using self-checkout machines, leading to a discrepancy between the actual and recorded weights of products.

Weight fraud can also involve the adulterating the product through the addition of lower-cost, inferior, or unnecessary ingredients, such as water, in order to increase its overall weight. This type of adulteration allows manufacturers or sellers to artificially inflate the weight of the product while reducing their production costs, thereby increasing their profits. However, this form of weight fraud misleads consumers and may negatively impact the quality, safety, or nutritional value of the product, potentially resulting in harm to both the consumers and the integrity of the marketplace.

In transportation, freight brokers and carriers may misstate weights to maximize profits.

== Food fraud ==
In retail food fraud, a product's packaging might state that it weighs more than it actually does, or a retail scale might be rigged to display an inflated weight.

The product's packaging may be fraudulently included in the product's weight, or if negligible, may be increased in weight, such as the pre-moistening of the meat diaper or adding ice to fish. Other common forms of short-weight include the intentional glazing with a "marinade" of water, citric acid, and salt glaze. The use of lower-cost plant-derived ingredients and the injection of water into meat may also occur.

=== Seafood ===
Shrimp and prawn may be injected with carboxymethyl cellulose gel to increase weight. Seafood may also be soaked in polyphosphates which have increased water retention allowing them to absorb excess water to increase weight.

=== Tea ===
Tea may be adulterated with fake materials and colorized agents to increase the volume that may be brewed.

== United States ==
=== Retail ===
In the United States, weight fraud is monitored by inspectors, and has been an ongoing concern.

In 1910, the Pennsylvania Department of Agriculture wrote:

Several of the trade journals reaching this office have been waging a more or less aggressive warfare against the petty swindle of short weight in the grocery business. It is very difficult to believe that any number of retail dealers are willing to resort to such petty cheating for the purposes of adding to their profits. That some do, however, is shown by the facts put upon record by the men who are trying to break up the practice and by the action of several legislative and municipal authorities in moving toward the task of providing a remedy. It is a habit that is a disgrace to those who indulge in it and an injury to the consumer. It should be outlawed by the States, and the offender should be made to feel the weight of public scorn.

A 2021 investigation by KNSD in San Diego found that some retail scales were measuring lighter than they should.

=== List of United States retail weight fraud cases ===
- In 1934, several New York matzoh manufacturers were found to be short-weighting their 5 lb packages to 4 lb 9 oz.
- In 2006, Albertsons was fined $2 million for failing to subtract packaging from deli and bulk food items.
- In 2015, Whole Foods in New York City was found to have routinely overstated the weight of prepackaged products.
- In 2024, Walmart settled a class action lawsuit for $45 million due to weight fraud.
- In 2024, Albertsons agreed to a $3.9 million settlement over allegations of fraudulent charging practices of promoting false weight of certain products.

=== Agriculture ===
To deter scale fraud, the USDS requires that stockyard owners, swine contractors, market agencies, dealers (including video auctions), packers, or live poultry dealers that weigh livestock, live poultry, or feed, must have their scales tested at least twice each calendar year. The first scale tests must occur between January 1 and June 30 of the calendar year and the second must occur between July 1 and December 31 of the calendar year. A minimum of 120 days is required between these two tests. More frequent testing is required for scales that do not maintain accuracy between tests.

=== Freight ===
In 1979, a GAO report found that household movers routinely inflated freight weights in a practice called "weight bumping."

In 2016, Maersk was fined $3.7 million for falsely inflating military cargo freight weights.

Freight weight fraud may also endangers carriers such as vessels and planes by shifting the center of gravity.

== See also ==
- Shrinkflation
- NIST Handbook 133, Checking the Net Contents of Packaged Goods
