= Meat water holding capacity =

Measure of meat moisture retention

Meat water holding capacity (WHC) refers to the ability of meat to retain moisture including moisture inherent to the muscle tissue and any fluids that may be added to the meat during processing. The WHC characteristic corresponds to meat juiciness and meat tenderness.

A standardized analytical method for assessing WHC has not been developed.

The water holding capacity influences the size of the meat diaper required for pre-packaged meat.
