= Finca Corredor =

- Location within Panama
- Coordinates: 8°21′0″N 82°51′0″W
- Country: Panama
- Province: Chiriquí

Population (2008)
  - Total: 1 529

Finca Corredor is a town in the Chiriquí province of Panama.

== Sources ==
- World Gazeteer: Panama – World-Gazetteer.com
