= Office broker =

An office broker is a more general term for a serviced office broker. The office broker company/ individual arranges transactions between a company or individual interested in renting office space and a business centre/ office space owner. Office brokers help business centre owners to advertise office space. The office broker then makes a commission when the deal is made. This is different to traditional commercial agents who tend to charge for their services and the client pays upon completion

An office broker develops relationships with property management firms and business centre owners and negotiates favourable prices on behalf of clients. The purpose of an office broker is to provide a single point of contact in which clients can access the entire office space market globally or regionally. An office broker will commonly advertise both office space and serviced office space.

To fulfill the goal of finding clients to rent serviced office space, a serviced office broker will often do the following.

- Find business centres/ office space in accordance with the clients needs and specification
- Request a property condition disclosure form and any other forms that may be needed from the business centre owner
- Request information from the business centre owner in order to describe the property successfully for advertising
- List the business centre/ office space available for rent to the public, often on the internet
- Advertise the business centre/ office space through listings, newsletters, promotions and other methods.
