= Corredor Público =

Mexican legal profession

A Corredor Público is a legal professional in Mexico with specific functions in the field of commerce. The main purpose of a Corredor Publico is to broker transactions between merchants. The position was redefined via legislation on December 28, 1992, as published in the Federal Official Daily Gazette by the Mexican Congress. It is regulated under the Corredor Publico Federal Law, which has federal jurisdiction in Mexico for most of the functions in which the Corredor Publico is competent.

== History ==
In the twentieth century, the activities of the Corredor Publico were regulated under the abrogated section three of title one of book one of the current Commerce code for the Country of Mexico. The position was redefined in 1992 in order to fulfill the demands of commercial activities in Mexico and due to the signing of the North American Free Trade Agreement, which came into effect in 1994.

Under Mexican legislation, the Corredor Publico is a fully credited lawyer that has the full support and accreditation of the Mexican federal government. The activities are supervised by the Ministry of Economy.

== Functions ==
In accordance to Article 6 of the Corredor Publico Federal law, the main functions of this legal professional are:

- To intermediate commercial transaction between buyers and sellers, acting as a licensed broker
- To act as judge under commercial arbitration
- To act as legal advisor, similar to a solicitor for common law judicial systems
- To appraise any kind of goods, services, rights and obligations
- To act as a notary public under federal jurisdiction issues; these are focused mainly on commercial transactions

The Corredor Publico is similar to a Civil Law notary public, but with specialized training in commercial (mercantile) law. Activities range from the simple incorporation of Mexican corporations to the most complex business transactions. Currently there are approximately 300 active Corredores Publicos in Mexico.
