= Auto transport broker =

Type of cargo broker

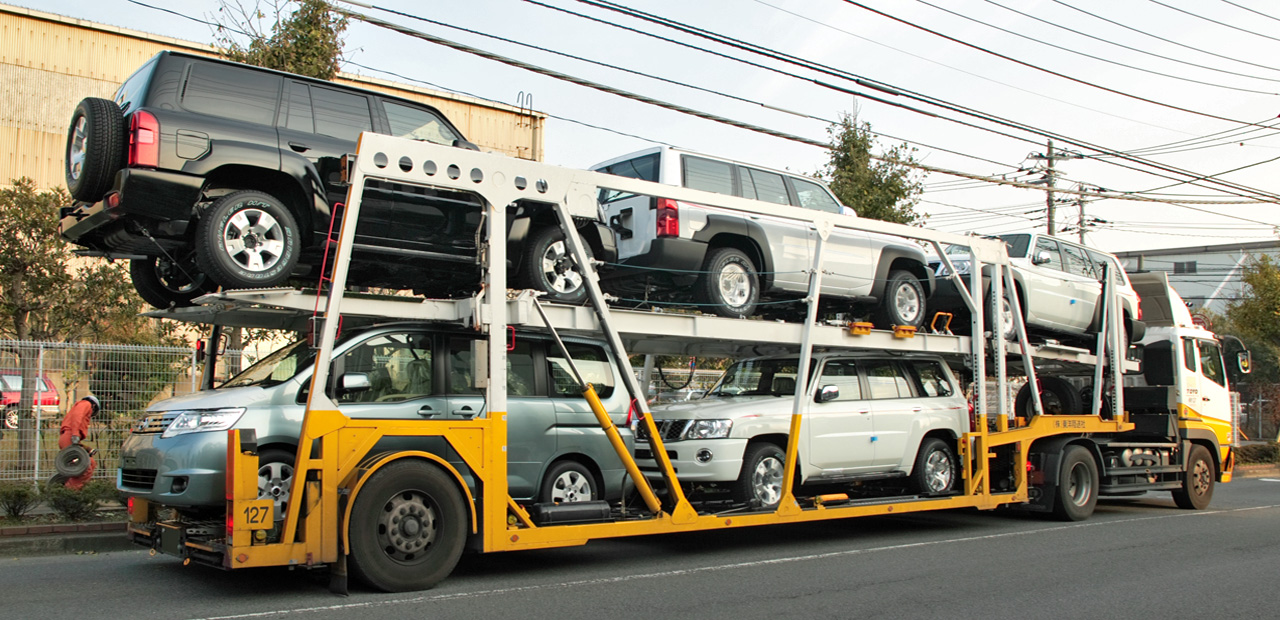
A car transporter truck loaded with multiple vehicles.

An auto transport broker is a type of cargo broker that specializes in the shipping and transportation of vehicles. Most vehicles shipped in the U.S. are cars and trucks, but many brokers handle boats, RVs, motorcycles and other types of vehicles as well. Auto transport is classified as "specialized freight trucking" under NAICS code 484230.

== Overview ==
An auto transport broker is part of the personal vehicle freight business industry chain. In the U.S., these broker companies must have proper licensing and authority from the FMCSA to be allowed to broker vehicles for customers. The individual or business that needs to move a car or other vehicle is the shipper; the shipper contacts a broker to have their vehicle shipped or transported. Once a broker is booked, the broker's job is to find a carrier, which is the individual or company that actually employs drivers and operates the car transport equipment.

Brokers are employed because they have access to freight load boards, where they can post the job and find carriers that have transportation resources in the area. They can also get lower shipping prices by getting competing bids by different carriers. However, brokers and carriers are not always separate entities - a number of auto transport companies handle both brokerage and transport.

== Statistics ==
The US Department of Transportation keeps statistics on cargo shipments, showing over $651 billion worth of motorized and other vehicles (including parts) moved by truck in 2007. Of that number, $452bn of cargo was moved via for-hire truck. Official statistics about the size of the secondary auto transport market, number of commercial-size car carrier vehicles on the road and number of vehicles shipped aren't kept by the DOT.

With the advent of the Internet, the auto transport industry has seen an influx of new brokers, attracted by the low cost of starting a brokerage business online. While this encouraged greater competition and lower costs in the industry, government agencies have also seen a "dramatic increase in complaints against auto transporters and auto transport brokers" due to Internet fraud.

== Licensing requirements ==
Auto transport brokers in the USA are subject to government licensing. The candidate must obtain an Operating Authority number from the Federal Motor Carrier Safety Administration by filling out a form on the FMCSA website. There is a small application processing fee. Brokers are also required to obtain a bond. Known as a Freight Broker Bond, it exists to primarily serve as an insurance policy for motor carriers, in the event that a freight broker fails to remit payment to a carrier when required to do so by a load contract. A motor carrier can "file" against a broker's surety bond if a broker fails to honor the payment terms of a contract. Prior to 2012 the minimum bond required by the FMCSA to obtain broker authority, was $10,000, although many brokers chose to obtain higher amounts.

== 2012 regulations ==
The Moving Ahead for Progress in the 21st Century Act, signed by President Obama on July 6 of 2012, introduced a number of new regulations for auto transport brokers. The chief among them is raising the minimum broker bond from $10,000 to $75,000. The new provision goes in force on October 1, 2013, and has applied to all existing brokers retroactively.

The BMC-84 Freight Broker Bond is paid for on an annual basis. The freight broker bond cost is figured as a percentage of the bond amount depending on

- Credit of ownership (credit score, age/status of any Public Records)
- Years in Business
- Financials
- Experience

Other rules include:

- A license status review by the FMCSA every five years; the FMCSA also has the power to revoke a broker's license in case of unethical practices.
- A 3-year relevant experience and certified training requirement to obtain a broker license, bringing auto shipping broker qualification requirements in line with the ocean shipping industry.
- Tighter regulation of "interlining," the practice of freight carriers hiring other carriers to "perform all or part of the services the originating carrier is obliged" to provide. Now, carriers that contract all or part of the job to other carriers will need to procure separate broker authority from the government. A transport company will also be required to notify its customers what role (carrier, forwarder or broker) it plays at each stage of the transport job, as well as which USDOT body regulates the activity.

=== Industry Reactions ===
The Association of Independent Property Brokers & Agents (AIPBA), a property broker trade group that claims 1,400 members, has petitioned and lobbied against higher bond requirements when these have been proposed in the past, and has harshly criticized the new law. The founder & president of AIPBA, James Lamb, has called the law a lobbyist-driven attempt to "eliminate small brokers from the market" and establish an oligopoly that charges customers more and pays carriers less.

The National Association for Minority Truckers (NAfMT) has also come out against the higher bond requirements. NAfMT CEO Kevin Reid called the $75,000 bond an "unreasonable barrier to entry for would-be entrepreneurs." He also spoke out against the new restrictions on owner-operators brokering out excess freight. The NAfMT has joined efforts by AIPBA to repeal the stricter surety requirements.

Other industry associations have been supportive of the law. The Owner-Operator Independent Drivers Association (OOIDA), a group that represents independent trucking owner-operators, has been a key force behind the new regulations. While the final rules in MAP-21 fell short of the OOIDA's wishes, Todd Spencer, executive vice president of the organization, praised them as a "win-win" for truckers and legitimate brokers.

The Transportation Intermediaries Association (TIA), a major third-party logistics trade organization, has also advocated for the new FMCSA regulations through its lobbying arm TIAPAC as a way to protect motor carriers from both incompetent and unscrupulous brokers. TIA board member Ken Lund acknowledged that the new bond may be difficult for smaller brokers to pay, but defended it as "reasonably priced" and useful to prevent fraud.

== See also ==
- Shipping agency
- Automotive industry
- Autorack
- Automotive safety
