= Case-ready meat =

Processed and packaged meat product

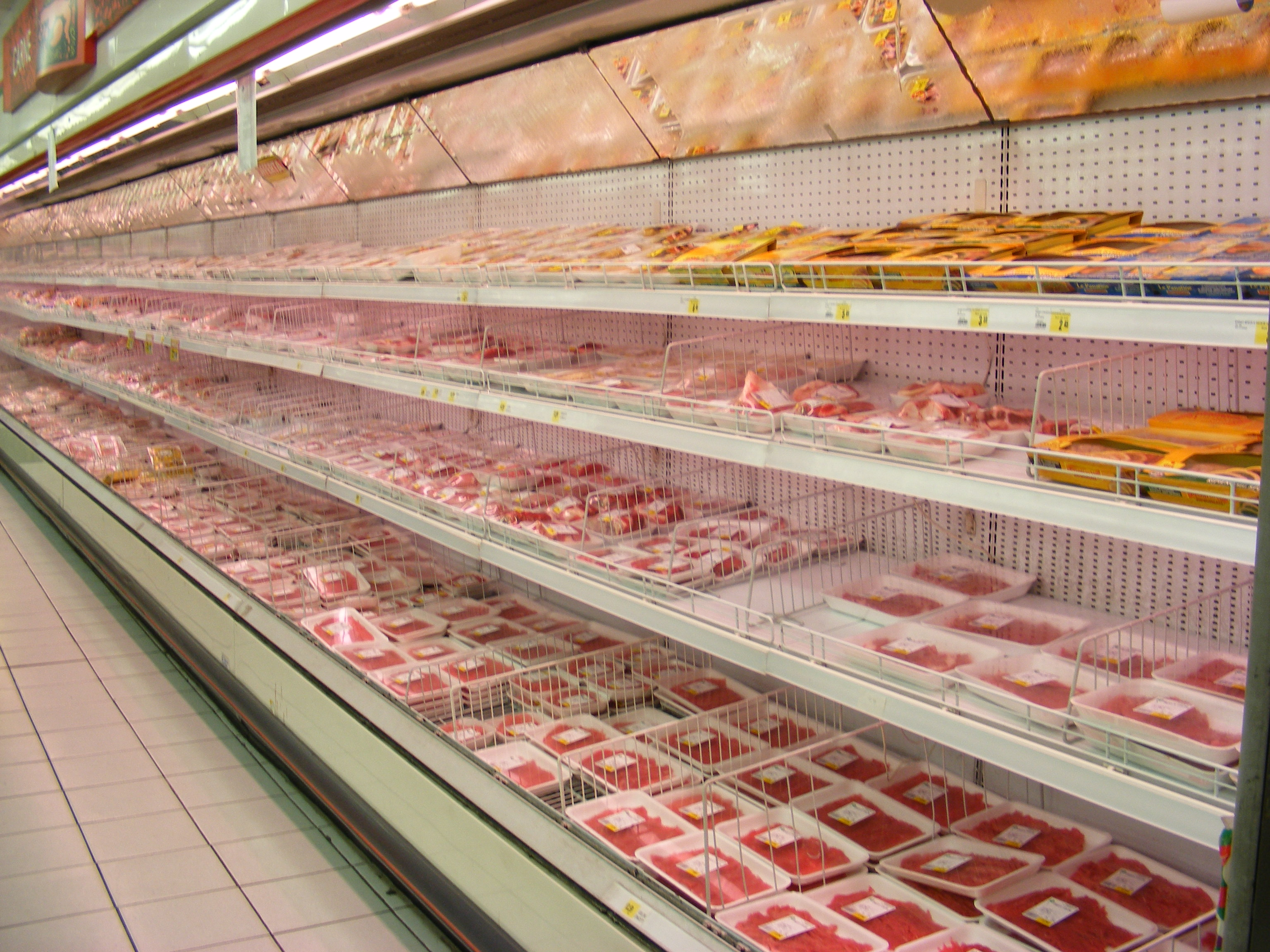
Packaged meat at a supermarket

Case-ready meat, retail-ready meat, or pre-packaged meat is fresh meat that is processed and packaged at a central facility and delivered to the retail stores ready to be put into the meat case.

== Background ==
Traditionally, most meat was shipped as primal cuts from the slaughterhouse to the butcher. Meat was then cut to commonly used cuts and packaged at the store or was custom cut for consumers.

Case-ready meat is cut and packaged at central regional facilities and sent to retail stores ready for placement in refrigerated display cases. Local butchering, cutting, trimming, and overwrapping the meat at retail stores is greatly reduced.

Advantages of the centralized master-packager preparation include: efficiency of centralized operations, tight quality control, close control of sanitization, specialized packaging, etc.

== Packaging ==
Centralized cutting and processing of meats has the potential of reducing the shelf life of the cuts. Specialized packaging is needed to regain and even extend that shelf life.

Packaging includes tray, absorbent pad (meat diaper), specialty plastic films, etc. Oxygen scavengers and modified atmosphere packaging are used to keep the products visually appealing and consumer safe.

== Distribution ==
Control of temperature during the distribution cold chain is critical to meat quality and safety.

== See also ==
- Food industry
- Food science
- Vacuum packaging
- Skin pack
