= 2026 Utah House of Representatives election =

- November 3, 2026

All 75 seats in the Utah House of Representatives 38 seats needed for a majority
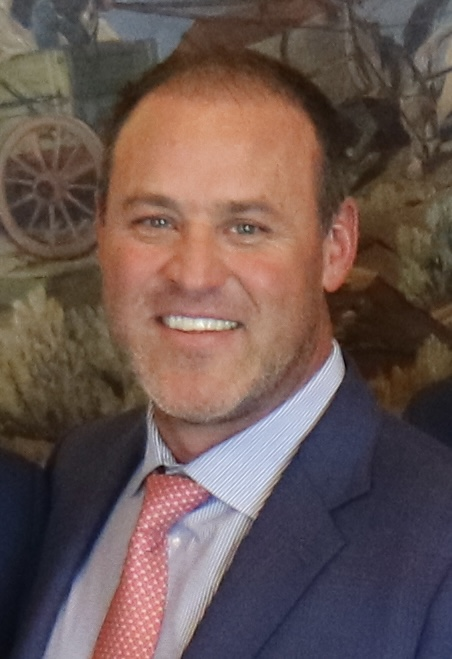

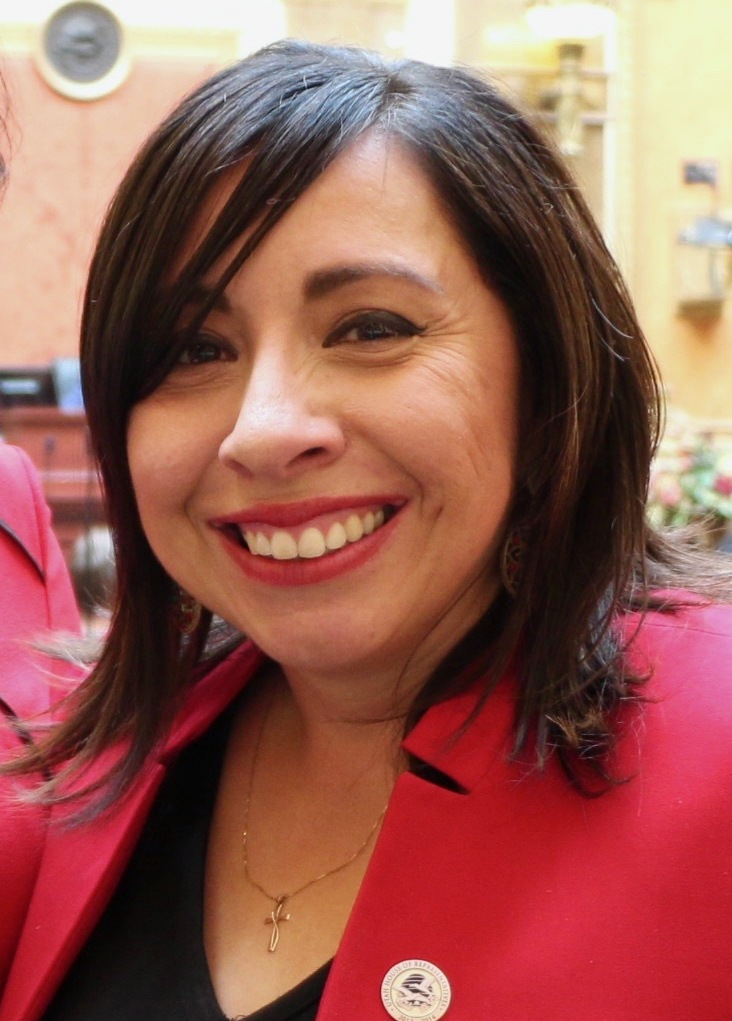

	Majority party	Minority party	Third party
Leader	Mike Schultz	Angela Romero
Party	Republican	Democratic	Independent
Leader since	November 15, 2023	January 17, 2023
Leader's seat	HD 12–Hooper	HD 25–Salt Lake City
Last election	61 seats, 69.94%	14 seats, 27.54%	0 seats, 1.04%
Seats won	45	28	2
Seat change	▼16	▲14	▲2
- Democratic hold Democratic gain Republican hold Independent gain
Speaker before election
Mike Schultz
Republican
Elected Speaker
Mike Schultz
Republican

The 2026 Utah House of Representatives election were held on November 3, 2026, alongside the other 2026 United States elections. Voters elected members of the Utah House of Representatives in all 75 of the U.S. state of Utah's legislative districts to serve a two-year term.

For the first time since 1993, the Republican Party did not maintain their supermajority in the Utah House, losing 16 seats to Democratic and independent candidates. Similar results were seen nationwide in the 2026 midterm elections, which saw eight other state legislatures lose their Republican supermajorities.

== Retirements ==
=== Republicans ===
- District 13: Karen Peterson is retiring.
- District 14: Karianne Lisonbee is retiring to run for Congress.
- District 17: Stewart Barlow is retiring.
- District 29: Bridger Bolinder is retiring.
- District 59: Mike Kohler is retiring.
- District 67: Christine Watkins is retiring to run for the Carbon County Commission.

=== Democrats ===
- District 21: Sandra Hollins is retiring.
- District 34: Carol Spackman Moss is retiring.

== Predictions ==
Source	Ranking	As of
Sabato's Crystal Ball	Safe R	January 22, 2026
State Navigate	Safe R	August 27, 2026

== Results ==
Results of the November 3, 2026 Utah House of Representatives election
Party	Candidates (Note: One candidate per district)	Votes			Seats		
Party	Candidates	No.	%	+/– (pp)	Before	After	+/–
Republican	72	509,919	51.60%	▼18.34	61	45	▼16
Democratic	64	439,112	44.43%	▲16.89	14	28	▲14
Independent	3	17,097	1.73%	▲0.69	0	2	▲2
Utah Forward	9	13,864	1.40%	▲1.05	0	0	Steady
Constitution	6	6,425	0.65%	▲0.53	0	0	Steady
Write-in	2	1,798	0.18%	Steady	0	0	Steady
Total			100.0%	Steady	75	75	Steady
Results as of November 9, 2026

== Summary by district ==
District		Incumbent				Candidates
District	2024 Pres.	Member	Party	First elected	Status	Candidates
1	R+63.4	Thomas Peterson	Republican	2022 (appointed)	Incumbent re-elected.	▌ ✓ Thomas Peterson (Republican); ▌Chris Reid (Democratic); ▌Jason O'Dell (Constitution)
2	R+37.0	Mike Petersen	Republican	2020	Incumbent re-elected.	▌ ✓ Mike Petersen (Republican); ▌Barbara J. Haggerty (Democratic)
3	R+10.3	Jason Thompson	Republican	2024	Incumbent lost re-election. Independent gain.	▌ ✓ Patrick Belmont (Independent); ▌Jason Thompson (Republican)
4	R+15.5	Tiara Auxier	Republican	2025 (appointed)	Incumbent lost re-election. Democratic gain.	▌ ✓ Zane Woolstenhulme (Democratic); ▌Tiara Auxier (Republican)
5	R +47.7	Casey Snider	Republican	2018 (appointed)	Incumbent reelected.	▌ ✓ Casey Snider (Republican); ▌Kendra Penry (Democratic)
6	R +51.3	Rob Bishop	Republican	2026 (appointed)	Incumbent reelected.	▌ ✓ Rob Bishop (Republican); ▌James Rich (Forward)
7	R +24.5	Ryan Wilcox	Republican	2024	Incumbent reelected.	▌ ✓ Ryan Wilcox (Republican); ▌Bianca Mittendorf (Democratic)
8	R +12.7	Jason Kyle	Republican	2022	Incumbent lost re-election. Democratic gain.	▌ ✓ Kim James (Democratic); ▌Jason Kyle (Republican)
9	R+20.8	Jake Sawyer	Republican	2024	Incumbent lost re-election. Democratic gain.	▌ ✓ Angela Choberka (Democratic); ▌Jake Sawyer (Republican)
10	R+2.9	Jill Koford	Republican	2024	Incumbent retiring. Democratic gain.	▌ ✓ Rosemary Lesser (Democratic); ▌Jim Alvey (Republican)
11	R +20.0	Katy Hall	Republican	2022	Incumbent re-elected.	▌ ✓ Katy Hall (Republican); ▌4Dave Calder (Democratic)
12	R +42.6	Mike Schultz	Republican	2014	Incumbent re-elected.	▌ ✓ Mike Schultz (Republican); ▌Anna Graff (Democratic)
13	R +32.0	Karen M. Peterson	Republican	2022 (appointed)	Incumbent retiring. Republican hold.	▌ ✓ Erik Craythorne (Republican); ▌Jeffrey Anderson (Democratic); ▌Tony De Mille (Forward)
14	R +32.2	Karianne Lisonbee	Republican	2016	Incumbent retiring. Republican hold.	▌ ✓ John Taylor (Republican); ▌Brandon Young (Democratic)
15	R +36.7	Ariel Defay	Republican	2023 (appointed)	Incumbent re-elected.	▌ ✓ Ariel Defay (Republican); ▌Anne Berbert (Democratic)
16	R +22.6	Trevor Lee (Note: Lost renomination, then resigned in September 2026 after being charged with fraud.)	Republican	2022	Incumbent lost renomination. Republican hold.	▌ ✓ Bob Stevenson (Republican); ▌Kendra Penry (Democratic)
17	R +25.4	Stewart Barlow	Republican	2011 (appointed)	Incumbent retiring. Republican hold.	▌ ✓ Lili Bitner (Republican); ▌Eric Last (Democratic)
18	R+23.2	Paul A. Cutler	Republican	2022	Incumbent re-elected.	▌ ✓ Paul A. Cutler (Republican); ▌Scott Troxel (Democratic)
19	R+14.4	Raymond Ward	Republican	2014	Incumbent re-elected.	▌ ✓ Raymond Ward (Republican)
20	R+7.2	Melissa Garff Ballard	Republican	2018	Incumbent lost re-election. Democratic gain.	▌ ✓ Phil Graves (Democratic); ▌Melissa Garff Ballard (Republican)
21	D+40.3	Sandra Hollins	Democratic	2014	Incumbent retiring. Democratic hold.	▌ ✓ Stephen Otterstrom (Democratic)
22	D+58.4	Jennifer Dailey-Provost	Democratic	2018	Incumbent re-elected.	▌ ✓ Jennifer Dailey-Provost (Democratic); ▌Char Varga (Republican)
23	D+58.4	Hoang Nguyen	Democratic	2024	Incumbent re-elected.	▌ ✓ Hoang Nguyen (Democratic); ▌Franklin D. Robinson (Republican); ▌Cabot W. Nelson (Forward)
24	D+63.7	Grant Amjad Miller	Democratic	2024	Incumbent re-elected.	▌ ✓ Grant Amjad Miller (Democratic); ▌Braeden J. Oswald (Republican)
25	D+58.4	Angela Romero	Democratic	2012	Incumbent re-elected.	▌ ✓ Hoang Nguyen (Democratic); ▌Richard T. Nowak (Republican)
26	R+1.3	Matt MacPherson	Republican	2023 (appointed)	Incumbent lost re-election. Democratic gain.	▌ ✓ Michael Finch (Democratic); ▌Matt MacPherson (Republican)
27	R+6.7	Anthony Loubet	Republican	2022	Incumbent lost re-election. Democratic gain.	▌ ✓ Liz Oates (Democratic); ▌Anthony Loubet (Republican)
28	R+33.0	Nicholeen Peck	Republican	2024	Incumbent re-elected.	▌ ✓ Nicholeen Peck (Republican); ▌Anita Dalrymple (Democratic); ▌Wales Nematollahi (Forward)
29	R+57.8	Bridger Bolinder	Republican	2022	Incumbent retiring. Republican hold.	▌ ✓ Sheldon Birch (Republican); ▌ Sara Snow (Democratic); ▌Jonathan Garrard (Constitution); ▌Tynley Bean (Forward)
30	D+3.0	Jake Fitisemanu	Democratic	2024	Incumbent re-elected.	▌ ✓ Jake Fitisemanu (Democratic); ▌Dave Parke (Republican)
31	D+14.2	Verona Mauga	Democratic	2024	Incumbent re-elected.	▌ ✓ Verona Mauga (Democratic); ▌Melody Jones (Republican)
32	D+48.9	Sahara Hayes	Democratic	2022	Incumbent re-elected.	▌ ✓ Sahara Hayes (Democratic); ▌Aileen Hampton (Republican)
33	D+34.4	Doug Owens	Democratic	2024	Incumbent re-elected.	▌ ✓ Doug Owens (Democratic); ▌Anna Reeves (Republican)
34	D+27.4	Carol Spackman Moss	Democratic	2000	Incumbent retiring. Democratic hold.	▌ ✓ Julie Jackson (Democratic)
35	D+18.6	Rosalba Dominguez	Democratic	2024	Incumbent re-elected.	▌ ✓ Rosalba Dominguez (Democratic); ▌Monique I. Ketcham (Republican)
36	R+3.8	James Dunnigan	Republican	2002	Incumbent lost re-election. Democratic gain.	▌ ✓ Blake Townsend (Democratic); ▌James Dunnigan (Republican)
37	D+2.5	Ashlee Matthews	Democratic	2020	Incumbent re-elected.	▌ ✓ Ashlee Matthews (Democratic); ▌Casey Saxton (Republican)
38	R +10.8	Cheryl Acton	Republican	2017 (appointed)	Incumbent retiring. Independent gain.	▌ ✓ Sergio Sotelo (Independent); ▌Chris McConnehey
39	R +4.9	Ken Ivory	Republican	2021 (appointed)	Incumbent lost re-election. Democratic gain.	▌ ✓ Drew Howells (Democratic); ▌Ken Ivory (Republican)
40	D+17.7	Andrew Stoddard	Democratic	2018	Incumbent re-elected.	▌ ✓ Andrew Stoddard (Democratic)
41	D+24.1	John Arthur	Democratic	2025 (appointed)	Incumbent re-elected.	▌ ✓ John Arthur (Democratic); ▌Darren Croft (Republican)
42	D+2.6	Clinton Okerlund	Republican	2024	Incumbent lost re-election. Democratic gain.	▌ ✓ Iva Williams (Democratic); ▌Clinton Okerlund (Republican)
43	D+5.6	Steve Eliason	Republican	2010	Incumbent lost re-election. Democratic gain.	▌ ✓ Ofa Matagi (Democratic); ▌Steve Eliason (Republican)
44	R+12.2	Jordan Teuscher	Republican	2020	Incumbent lost re-election. Democratic gain.	▌ ✓ Jess Birtcher (Democratic); ▌Jordan Teuscher (Republican)
45	R+16.5	Tracy Miller	Republican	2024	Incumbent re-elected.	▌ ✓ Tracy Miller (Republican); ▌Rod Moser (Democratic)
46	R+20.1	Calvin Rolberts	Republican	2024	Incumbent re-elected.	▌ ✓ Calvin Roberts (Republican); ▌Braxton Rutherford (Democratic)
47	R+31.0	Mark A. Strong	Republican	2018	Incumbent re-elected.	▌ ✓ Mark A. Strong (Republican)
48	R+39.4	Doug Fiefia	Republican	2024	Incumbent retiring. Republican hold.	▌ ✓ Jake Hunsaker (Republican); ▌Benyde Walker (Democratic)
49	R+34.5	Candice Pierucci	Republican	2019 (appointed)	Incumbent re-elected.	▌ ✓ Candice Pierucci (Republican); ▌Lillian Bowles (Democratic)
50	R+49.6	Stephanie Gricius	Republican	2022	Incumbent re-elected.	▌ ✓ Stephanie Gricius (Republican); ▌Kristin Meyer (Democratic)
51	R+40.2	Leah Hansen	Republican	2025 (appointed)	Incumbent re-elected.	▌ ✓ Leah Hansen (Republican); ▌Brett Nielsen (Democratic)
52	R+37.3	Cory Maloy	Republican	2016	Incumbent re-elected.	▌ ✓ Cory Maloy (Republican); ▌Nicole Melling (Democratic)
53	R+39.4	Kay Christofferson	Republican	2012	Incumbent re-elected.	▌ ✓ Kay Christofferson (Republican); ▌John Boyd (Forward); ▌Kevin Slater (Democratic)
54	R+47.8	Kristen Chevrier	Republican	2024	Incumbent re-elected.	▌ ✓ Kristen Chevrier (Republican); ▌Kristina Robinson (Democratic)
55	R+42.0	Jon Hawkins	Republican	2018	Incumbent re-elected.	▌ ✓ Jon Hawkins (Republican); ▌Travis Hysell (Democratic)
56	R+27.8	Val Peterson	Republican	2010	Incumbent re-elected.	▌ ✓ Val Peterson (Republican); ▌Natassja Grossman (Democratic)
57	R+31.0	Nelson Abbott	Republican	2020	Incumbent re-elected.	▌ ✓ Nelson Abbott (Republican)
58	R+31.3	David Shallenberger	Republican	2024	Incumbent re-elected.	▌ ✓ David Shallenberger (Republican); ▌Karli Black (Democratic)
59	R+18.5	Mike Kohler	Republican	2020	Incumbent retiring. Democratic gain.	▌ ✓ Celeste Johnson (Democratic); ▌Luke Searle (Republican)
60	R+13.1	Grant Pace	Republican	2026 (appointed)	Incumbent re-elected.	▌ ✓ Grant Pace (Republican)
61	R+25.9	Lisa Shepherd	Republican	2024	Incumbent re-elected.	▌ ✓ Lisa Shepherd (Republican); ▌Alan Jimenez (Democratic); ▌Jennifer K. Doud (Constitution)
62	R+18.1	Norm Thurston	Republican	2014	Incumbent lost re-election. Democratic gain.	▌ ✓ David Chappell (Democratic); ▌Norm Thurston (Republican)
63	R+46.9	Stephen L. Whyte	Republican	2021 (appointed)	Incumbent re-elected.	▌ ✓ Stephen L. Whyte (Republican); ▌Mark Youngquist (Democratic); ▌Julie Smith (Forward)
64	R+53.5	Jefferson S. Burton	Republican	2020	Incumbent retiring. Republican hold.	▌ ✓ Jackie Larson (Republican); ▌Alan Wessman (Independent)
65	R+59.9	Doug Welton	Republican	2020	Incumbent re-elected.	▌ ✓ Doug Welton (Republican)
66	R+70.6	Troy Shelley	Republican	2024	Incumbent re-elected.	▌ ✓ Stephen L. Whyte (Republican); ▌Breanne Mashek (Democratic); ▌Russ Hatch (Constitution)
67	R+59.4	Christine Watkins	Republican	2016	Incumbent retiring. Republican hold.	▌ ✓ JR Bird (Republican); ▌Carl Ingwell (Democratic)
68	R+74.5	Scott Chew	Republican	2014	Incumbent re-elected.	▌ ✓ Scott Chew (Republican); ▌Sonya Ray (Constitution)
69	R+28.2	Logan Monson	Republican	2024	Incumbent re-elected.	▌ ✓ Logan Monson (Republican); ▌Tracie Yellowman Tso (Democratic)
70	R+74.0	Carl Albrecht	Republican	2016	Incumbent re-elected.	▌ ✓ Carl Albrecht (Republican); ▌Stacey D. Pendergraft (Democratic); ▌Zeno B. Parry (Forward)
71	R+52.4	Rex Shipp	Republican	2018	Incumbent re-elected.	▌ ✓ Rex Shipp (Republican); ▌Thomas Loveheart (Democratic)
72	R+58.9	Joseph Elison	Republican	2022	Incumbent re-elected.	▌ ✓ Joseph Elison (Republican); ▌Eva M. Weldon (Democratic); ▌April A. Pinkston (Constitution)
73	R+56.2	Colin W. Jack	Republican	2022 (appointed)	Incumbent re-elected.	▌ ✓ Colin W. Jack (Republican); ▌Glenn D. Webb (Democratic)
74	R+42.7	R. Neil Walter	Republican	2022	Incumbent re-elected.	▌ ✓ R. Neil Walter (Republican); ▌Jeffrey N. Lipe (Democratic)
75	R+42.7	Walt Brooks	Republican	2016 (appointed)	Incumbent re-elected.	▌ ✓ Walt Brooks (Republican); ▌Rebecca Winsor (Democratic)
Sources: State of Utah and The New York Times
