= List of third-party and independent performances in Utah state legislative elections =

Since the Utah Legislature first convened in 1896, hundreds of third-party and independent candidates have run for state legislative offices. Only candidates who have earned at least 5% of the vote will be shown.

== State senate ==
Election	District	Party	Candidate	Votes	%	Place	Ref
2024	SD 8	Unaffiliated	Alisa Cox van Langeveld	8,782	17.18 / 100	3rd of 4	
2024	SD 16	Unaffiliated	Monnica Manuel	18,397	42.52 / 100	2nd of 2	
2024	SD 17	Unaffiliated	Pamela Bloom	19,211	36.10 / 100	2nd of 2	
2024	SD 24	Unaffiliated	Lori Andersen Spruance	11,896	34.06 / 100	2nd of 2	
2024	SD 26	Unaffiliated	Oran Stainbrook	3,044	5.84 / 100	3rd of 3	
2022	SD 7	United Utah	Kimberly Wagner	10,651	28.06 / 100	2nd of 2	
2022	SD 18	United Utah	Jed C. Nordfelt	1,842	5.12 / 100	3rd of 3	
2022	SD 19	United Utah	Tyler L. Peterson	3,301	6.88 / 100	3rd of 3	
2022	SD 28	Libertarian	Barry Evan Short	3,766	10.11 / 100	2nd of 3	
2022	SD 28	United Utah	Patricia A. Bradford	3,354	9.00 / 100	3rd of 3	
2020	SD 7	United Utah	Emily Bergeson	11,351	22.3 / 100	2nd of 2	
2020	SD 23	Write-in	Marci Green Campbell	2,656	6.1 / 100	2nd of 2	
2020	SD 24	Independent American	Warren Rogers	4,441	9.8 / 100	2nd of 2	
2018	SD 9	United Utah	Alexander Castagno	12,639	33.77 / 100	2nd of 3	
2018	SD 15	United Utah	Lee D. Houghton	3,425	13.09 / 100	2nd of 3	
2018	SD 15	Independent American	Tommy Williams	2,738	10.46 / 100	3rd of 3	
2018	SD 18	Libertarian	Kevin L. Bryan	2,095	6.58 / 100	3rd of 3	
2016	SD 6	Libertarian	Jim Dexter	2,266	6.61 / 100	3rd of 3	
2016	SD 14	Libertarian	Joe Buchman	3,776	9.40 / 100	2nd of 3	
2016	SD 16	Independent American	Jason Christensen	5,092	19.16 / 100	2nd of 2	
2014	SD 17	Constitution	Kirk D. Pearson	1,939	10.04 / 100	3rd of 3	
2014	SD 22	Libertarian	Brent Zimmerman	1,643	7.25 / 100	3rd of 3	
2012	SD 19	Libertarian	Courtney White	1,798	5.48 / 100	3rd of 3	
2012	SD 24	Constitution	Trestin Meacham	4,647	13.57 / 100	2nd of 2	
2010	SD 17	Constitution	Sherry Phipps	2,463	10.45 / 100	3rd of 3	
2010	SD 22	Constitution	David A. Hansen	2,028	8.72 / 100	3rd of 3	
2008	SD 10	Constitution	Steve Maxfield	2,128	5.34 / 100	3rd of 3	
2008	SD 24	Constitution	Brenton L. Petersen	2,666	9.45 / 100	3rd of 3	
2006	SD 12	Constitution	Ray Pearson	805	5.25 / 100	3rd of 3	
2006	SD 15	Constitution	Gordon Mella	1,028	6.21 / 100	3rd of 3	
2006	SD 17	Constitution	Kirk D. Pearson	1,541	6.85 / 100	3rd of 3	
2006	SD 22	Constitution	Sheryl Fluckinger	1,200	5.82 / 100	3rd of 3	
2006	SD 24	Constitution	Gary R. Vanhorn	1,796	8.22 / 100	3rd of 3	
2006	SD 26	Constitution	Sonya Ray	1,807	7.72 / 100	3rd of 3	
2006	SD 28	Constitution	Woodard H. Westfall	1,556	6.74 / 100	3rd of 3	
2002	SD 9	Libertarian	Charles A. Bonsall	3,973	19.81 / 100	2nd of 2	
2002	SD 15	Libertarian	Beryl Furner	1,436	9.70 / 100	2nd of 2	
2002	SD 22	Green	David L. Rowland	2,700	13.50 / 100	2nd of 2	
2000	SD 2	Independent American	Sandra Richter	2,179	15.35 / 100	2nd of 3	
2000	SD 2	Libertarian	Richard D. Barnes	1,218	8.58 / 100	3rd of 3	
2000	SD 28	Independent American	Gary R. Van Horn	1,682	6.28 / 100	3rd of 3	

== State house ==
Election	District	Party	Candidate	Votes	%	Place	Ref
2024	HD 3	Unaffiliated	Patrick Belmont	6,693	46.34 / 100	2nd of 2	
2024	HD 15	Utah Forward	Josh Smith	4,776	24.28 / 100	2nd of 2	
2024	HD 17	Libertarian	Adam Feller	3,921	21.09 / 100	2nd of 2	
2024	HD 19	Constitution	Cameron A. Dransfield	1,555	7.64 / 100	3rd of 3	
2024	HD 39	Unaffiliated	Jessica Wignall	7,093	44.68 / 100	2nd of 2	
2024	HD 47	United Utah	David Lundgren	5,011	24.88 / 100	2nd of 2	
2024	HD 53	United Utah	Alex Day	3,881	19.95 / 100	2nd of 2	
2024	HD 70	United Utah	Zeno B. Parry	1,395	6.68 / 100	2nd of 2	
2022	HD 9	Libertarian	Jacob K. Johnson	723	7.28 / 100	3rd of 3	
2022	HD 15	United Utah	Ammon Gruwell	3,147	22.35 / 100	2nd of 2	
2022	HD 16	Write-in	Steve Handy	4,630	35.32 / 100	2nd of 3	
2022	HD 16	Libertarian	Brent Zimmerman	2,103	16.04 / 100	3rd of 3	
2022	HD 20	Libertarian	Daniel Rhead Cottam	764	5.72 / 100	3rd of 3	
2022	HD 29	Constitution	Kirk D. Pearson	2,254	14.81 / 100	2nd of 3 Beat Democrat	
2022	HD 30	United Utah	Evan Rodgers	638	6.21 / 100	3rd of 3	
2022	HD 42	United Utah	David B. Jack	4,326	21.70 / 100	2nd of 3	
2022	HD 42	Independent	Carson Barlow	4,081	20.47 / 100	3rd of 3	
2022	HD 46	United Utah	Ladd Johnson	5,562	35.47 / 100	2nd of 2	
2022	HD 47	United Utah	Dave Lundgren	4,530	29.82 / 100	2nd of 2	
2022	HD 51	Libertarian	Jeremy Baker	2,552	18.73 / 100	2nd of 2	
2022	HD 54	United Utah	Andrew W. Matishen	993	5.53 / 100	3rd of 3	
2022	HD 64	United Utah	Alan Wessman	2,761	23.79 / 100	2nd of 2	
2022	HD 66	Constitution	Russ Hatch	2,347	15.88 / 100	2nd of 2	
2022	HD 70	United Utah	Zeno B. Parry	1,228	8.12 / 100	2nd of 2	
2022	HD 71	United Utah	Piper Manesse	886	7.22 / 100	3rd of 3	
2020	HD 1	Constitution	Sherry Phipps	1,402	7.37 / 100	3rd of 3	
2020	HD 6	United Utah	Christopher L. Rawlins	4,767	19.60 / 100	2nd of 2	
2020	HD 12	United Utah	Shawn Ferriola	3,983	22.81 / 100	2nd of 2	
2020	HD 15	United Utah	Ammon Gruwell	5,301	22.78 / 100	2nd of 2	
2020	HD 16	Libertarian	Brent Zimmerman	1,361	7.77 / 100	3rd of 3	
2020	HD 17	Constitution	Jeannette Proctor	1,077	5.34 / 100	3rd of 3	
2020	HD 19	Constitution	Cameron Dransfield	3,876	19.63 / 100	2nd of 2	
2020	HD 41	United Utah	David M. Lundgren	1,602	6.42 / 100	3rd of 3	
2020	HD 42	United Utah	Jefferson Bardin	825	5.41 / 100	3rd of 3	
2020	HD 56	United Utah	Kate Walters	3,576	18.41 / 100	2nd of 2	
2020	HD 58	Constitution	Russell Garn Hatch	1,807	10.62 / 100	2nd of 3	
2020	HD 59	United Utah	Catherine Eslinger	4,841	24.21 / 100	2nd of 3	
2020	HD 60	United Utah	Christine Heath	3,540	22.03 / 100	2nd of 3	
2020	HD 60	Independent American	Tommy Williams	846	5.26 / 100	3rd of 3	
2020	HD 63	United Utah	Austin Simcox	588	7.58 / 100	3rd of 3	
2020	HD 68	Constitution	Kirk D. Pearson	1,920	9.02 / 100	3rd of 3	
2020	HD 72	United Utah	Piper Manesse	1,374	7.48 / 100	3rd of 3	
2018	HD 1	Constitution	Sherry Phipp	1,113	9.28 / 100	3rd of 3	
2018	HD 16	Libertarian	Brent Zimmerman	1,065	8.37 / 100	3rd of 3	
2018	HD 19	Libertarian	Joe Speciale	1,101	6.55 / 100	3rd of 3	
2018	HD 22	Libertarian	Amber Christiansen Beltran	749	7.24 / 100	3rd of 4	
2018	HD 25	United Utah	Cabot W. Nelson	1,458	8.87 / 100	2nd of 2	
2018	HD 35	Libertarian	Chelsea Travis	967	9.04 / 100	3rd of 3	
2018	HD 41	United Utah	Steve Walston	1607	8.98 / 100	3rd of 3	
2018	HD	United Utah	Amy L. Martz	4,803	33.06 / 100	2nd of 2	
2018	HD 43	Libertarian	Shawn Curtis	853	7.21 / 100	3rd of 3	
2018	HD 48	Independent American	Aaron Heineman	1,612	13.05 / 100	2nd of 2	
2018	HD 49	United Utah	Mark Russell	1,112	5.92 / 100	3rd of 3	
2018	HD 51	United Utah	Michele Weeks	5,577	39.05 / 100	2nd of 2	
2018	HD 57	United Utah	Hillary Stirling	2,898	23.84 / 100	2nd of 2	
2018	HD 58	Constitution	Russell G. Hatch	990	8.63 / 100	3rd of 3	
2018	HD 59	Independent American	Gregory Hmura	2,026	17.11 / 100	2nd of 2	
2018	HD 61	United Utah	Eric Chase	1,405	14.53 / 100	2nd of 3	
2018	HD 61	Green	Matt Styles	859	8.88 / 100	3rd of 3	
2018	HD 64	United Utah	Hal Miller	1,219	13.96 / 100	3rd of 3	
2018	HD 68	Constitution	Kirk D. Pearson	960	6.52 / 100	3rd of 5	
2018	HD 72	Libertarian	Barry Evan Short	1,001	8.42 / 100	3rd of 3	
2018	HD 73	Unaffiliated	Marsha M Holland	4,528	32.54 / 100	2nd of 2	
2018	HD 74	Libertarian	Daniel Holloway	4,082	23.75 / 100	2nd of 2	
2018	HD 75	Independent American	Keith R. Kelsch	1,353	11.03 / 100	2nd of 3	
2018	HD 75	Libertarian	Michael A. Gardner	1,341	10.93 / 100	3rd of 3	
2016	HD 1	Constitution	Sherry Phipp	2,333	17.15 / 100	2nd of 2	
2016	HD 6	Libertarian	Aaron A. Davis	888	5.44 / 100	3rd of 3	
2016	HD 10	Libertarian	Derryck Gordon	788	6.99 / 100	3rd of 3	
2016	HD 16	Libertarian	Brent Zimmerman	1,214	8.45 / 100	3rd of 3	
2016	HD 35	Libertarian	Chelsea Travis	941	9.44 / 100	3rd of 3	
2016	HD 46	Libertarian	Lee Anne Walker	3,932	23.86 / 100	2nd of 2	
2016	HD 68	Constitution	Kirk Pearson	1,597	10.56 / 100	3rd of 3	
2014	HD 1	Constitution	Lee H. Phipps	607	8.39 / 100	3rd of 3	
2014	HD 2	Independent American	Charles Christensen	1,110	16.89 / 100	2nd of 2	
2014	HD 16	Constitution	Jeffrey Ostler	469	7.14 / 100	3rd of 3	
2014	HD 19	Independent American	Eli Cawley	526	5.05 / 100	3rd of 3	
2014	HD 20	Constitution	Robert G. Moultrie	488	6.59 / 100	3rd of 3	
2014	HD 22	Constitution	Marilee Roose	350	6.67 / 100	3rd of 3	
2014	HD 23	Libertarian	Megan Clegg	227	5.67 / 100	3rd of 3	
2014	HD 40	Libertarian	Rainer Huck	482	5.36 / 100	3rd of 3	
2014	HD 64	Independent American	Jason Christensen	432	11.12 / 100	3rd of 3	
2014	HD 70	Constitution	R. Glenn Stoneman	1,213	13.02 / 100	3rd of 3	
2014	HD 72	Libertarian	Barry Evan Short	990	15.84 / 100	2nd of 3	
2014	HD 75	Independent American	Nihla W. Judd	1,444	20.20 / 100	2nd of 3 Beat Democrat	
2012	HD 1	Constitution	Becky Maddox	1,403	10.20 / 100	3rd of 3	
2012	HD 8	Libertarian	Jared Paul Stratton	658	5.52 / 100	3rd of 3	
2012	HD 22	Constitution	Marilee Roose	2,331	26.69 / 100	2nd of 2	
2012	HD 26	Green	Mark Dee Whitaker	528	7.01 / 100	3rd of 3	
2012	HD 27	Constitution	Scott Morgan	1,222	7.85 / 100	2nd of 2	
2012	HD 35	Libertarian	Chelsea Travis	595	6.69 / 100	3rd of 3	
2012	HD 59	Libertarian	Kenny Barlow	880	7.53 / 100	2rd of 3	
2012	HD 59	Constitution	Benjamin Norton	840	7.19 / 100	3rd of 3	
2012	HD 65	Constitution	Ken Bowers	1,718	13.32 / 100	2nd of 2	
2012	HD 68	Constitution	Paul J. McCollaum Jr.	953	7.16 / 100	3rd of 3	
2012	HD 70	Constitution	L.S. Brown	988	7.03 / 100	3rd of 3	
2012	HD 71	Constitution	Paul Sevy	890	6.57 / 100	3rd of 3	
2012	HD 72	Libertarian	Barry Evan Short	1,786	14.60 / 100	2nd of 2	
2012	HD 73	Justice	Ty Markham	3,741	28.04 / 100	2nd of 2	
2012	HD 75	Constitution	Randall Hinton	701	5.36 / 100	3rd of 3	
2010	HD 2	Constitution	Becky Maddox	1,771	19.83 / 100	2nd of 2	
2010	HD 20	Constitution	Robert G. Moultrie	675	7.50 / 100	3rd of 3	
2010	HD 21	Constitution	Jonathan Dee Garrard	656	7.24 / 100	3rd of 3	
2010	HD 35	Libertarian	Chelsea Travis	299	6.22 / 100	3rd of 3	
2010	HD 40	Libertarian	Sandra Johnson	477	5.55 / 100	3rd of 3	
2010	HD 41	Constitution	Matt Woolley	510	6.70 / 100	3rd of 3	
2010	HD 50	Constitution	Russell G. Hatch	959	6.70 / 100	3rd of 3	
2010	HD 52	Unaffiliated	Chad Reyes	2,725	21.62 / 100	2nd of 4	
2010	HD 57	Constitution	Curt Crosby	648	6.82 / 100	3rd of 3	
2010	HD 67	Constitution	Feleni Siufanua	631	6.84 / 100	3rd of 3	
2010	HD 68	Constitution	Gary R. Van Horn	1,428	17.89 / 100	2nd of 2	
2010	HD 70	Constitution	LS Brown	1,617	17.14 / 100	2nd of 2	
2010	HD 72	Libertarian	Barry Evan Short	1,450	16.47 / 100	2nd of 2	
2010	HD 74	Constitution	Philip O. Jensen	791	5.53 / 100	3rd of 3	
2008	HD 2	Constitution	Tom Edwards	2,338	18.12 / 100	2nd of 2	
2008	HD 17	Constitution	David A. Armstrong	795	5.79 / 100	3rd of 3	
2008	HD 21	Constitution	Johnathan Dee Garrard	832	6.38 / 100	3rd of 3	
2008	HD 22	Constitution	Thomas M. Magum	2,062	23.81 / 100	2nd of 2	
2008	HD 50	Constitution	Russel G. Hatch	1,050	5.45 / 100	3rd of 3	
2008	HD 60	Constitution	Scott Swain	627	8.40 / 100	3rd of 3	
2008	HD 67	Constitution	Feleni Siufanua	3,251	9.22 / 100	2nd of 2	
2008	HD 68	Constitution	Susan Kaye Sorensen	862	7.84 / 100	3rd of 4	
2008	HD 70	Constitution	Bevan Bastian	2,697	22.73 / 100	2nd of 2	
2008	HD 72	Constitution	Ryan Bundy	1,309	9.56 / 100	3rd of 3	
2008	HD 73	Constitution	Allison Howes	737	5.76 / 100	3rd of 3	
2006	HD 13	Personal Choice	Ben F. Wofford	1,229	18.46 / 100	2nd of 2	
2006	HD 19	Constitution	Cory G. Seegmiller	481	5.73 / 100	3rd of 4	
2006	HD 21	Constitution	Jonathan D. Garrard	484	5.27 / 100	3rd of 3	
2006	HD 29	Constitution	Susan Kaye Sorensen	251	5.19 / 100	3rd of 4	
2006	HD 43	Desert Greens	Tom King	488	7.86 / 100	3rd of 3	
2006	HD 50	Constitution	Randy Browning	1,586	16.60 / 100	2nd of 2	
2006	HD 56	Libertarian	Bryan Livingston	518	5.01 / 100	3rd of 3	
2006	HD 58	Constitution	Edward McGarr	2,187	29.92 / 100	2nd of 2	
2006	HD 59	Libertarian	Russ Zimmerman	747	14.99 / 100	2nd of 2	
2006	HD 60	Constitution	Scott Swain	640	10.11 / 100	3rd of 3	
2006	HD 61	Constitution	Steve Saunders	382	6.07 / 100	3rd of 3	
2006	HD 64	Constitution	Shaun A. Knapp	298	6.95 / 100	3rd of 3	
2006	HD 71	Constitution	Phillip O. Jensen	621	6.46 / 100	3rd of 3	
2006	HD 72	Constitution	Sharla Christie	847	10.33 / 100	3rd of 3	
2004	HD 2	Constitution	Tom Edwards	1,543	12.76 / 100	2nd of 2	
2004	HD 13	Constitution	Kevin Oliver	1,553	14.02 / 100	2nd of 2	
2004	HD 15	Libertarian	Don E. Kingsley	960	8.22 / 100	2nd of 3	
2004	HD 15	Personal Choice	J. Mark Burnside	658	5.63 / 100	3rd of 3	
2004	HD 29	Constitution	Susan Kaye Sorensen	423	5.03 / 100	3rd of 3	
2004	HD 30	Personal Choice	Ian Scharine	1,239	11.50 / 100	2nd of 2	
2004	HD 43	Green	Tom King	1,003	9.75 / 100	2nd of 3	
2004	HD 43	Libertarian	D. Mark Faux	768	7.47 / 100	3rd of 3	
2004	HD 52	Libertarian	Matthew D. Lund	2,081	14.89 / 100	2nd of 2	
2004	HD 54	Constitution	Douglas K. Thompson	1,682	14.42 / 100	2nd of 2	
2004	HD 55	Green	John Weisheit	921	7.76 / 100	2nd of 4	
2004	HD 55	Constitution	Dale Flake	850	7.17 / 100	3rd of 4	
2004	HD 58	Constitution	Edward T. McGarr	1,496	14.81 / 100	2nd of 2	
2004	HD 59	Libertarian	Russ Zimmerman	1,448	16.18 / 100	2nd of 2	
2004	HD 64	Libertarian	Mark D. Lees	800	10.54 / 100	2nd of 2	
2004	HD 68	Constitution	Benton L. Petersen	1,339	13.46 / 100	2nd of 2	
2004	HD 70	Constitution	Bob A. Sharp	1,158	10.72 / 100	2nd of 2	
2004	HD 71	Libertarian	Jedediah Stout	1,577	12.41 / 100	2nd of 2	
2004	HD 73	Green	Victoria Woodard	1,300	11.29 / 100	2nd of 2	
2004	HD 74	Libertarian	Sergio E. Della Pietra	1,133	8.20 / 100	2nd of 2	
2002	HD 4	Independent	Morley Cox	535	8.35 / 100	3rd of 3	
2002	HD 16	Green	Jon Roesler	810	13.79 / 100	2nd of 2	
2002	HD 53	Green	Laura Bonham	732	7.42 / 100	3rd of 3	
2002	HD 55	Green	John Weisheit	1,406	17.69 / 100	2nd of 2	
2002	HD 56	Libertarian	Bryan Livingston	658	9.35 / 100	2nd of 2	
2002	HD 64	Libertarian	Mark D. Lees	504	12.95 / 100	2nd of 2	
2002	HD 67	Libertarian	Steve Thomas	1,118	17.60 / 100	2nd of 2	
2000	HD 4	Libertarian	Dave Nelson	905	14.07 / 100	2nd of 2	
2000	HD 5	Write-in	Evan L. Olsen	902	8.76 / 100	3rd of 3	
2000	HD 9	Independent American	Scott James Shupe	310	7.70 / 100	3rd of 3	
2000	HD 11	Independent American	Warren A. Vaughn	424	5.20 / 100	3rd of 3	
2000	HD 13	Libertarian	Donald A. Kingsley	620	5.28 / 100	3rd of 3	
2000	HD 16	Libertarian	Laren C. Livingston	1,513	12.75 / 100	2nd of 2	
2000	HD 24	Libertarian	Joyce Jefferson	572	5.96 / 100	3rd of 3	
2000	HD 26	Independent American	Renee Dale	331	6.48 / 100	3rd of 4	
2000	HD 30	Libertarian	Richard R. Madsen	583	6.35 / 100	3rd of 3	
2000	HD 44	Independent American	Carla Bangerter	531	5.62 / 100	3rd of 3	
2000	HD 54	Natural Law	Debra L. Whiting	1,647	18.03 / 100	2nd of 3	
2000	HD 68	Independent American	Frank M. Crowther	1,349	14.49 / 100	2nd of 2	
2000	HD 72	Independent American	Victor A. Schafer	1,352	11.35 / 100	2nd of 2	
