= Erik Craythorne =

American politician

Member-elect of the Utah House of Representatives from the 13th district
- Assuming office January 1, 2027
- Succeeding: Karen M. Peterson

Personal details
- Party: Republican
- Website: Campaign website

Erik Craythorne is an American politician. A member of the Republican Party, he is the member-elect for the 13th district of the Utah House of Representatives. He was elected at the 2026 election.
