= Karen Peterson =

Karen Peterson may refer to:

- Karen Peterson (animator)
- Karen E. Peterson, a state legislator in Delaware
- Karen Carter Peterson, a state legislator in Louisiana
- Karen M. Peterson, a state legislator in Utah
