= Ofa Matagi =

American politician

Member-elect of the Utah House of Representatives from the 43rd district
- Assuming office January 2027
- Succeeding: Steve Eliason

Personal details
- Born: West Valley City, Utah
- Party: Democratic

Ofa Matagi is an American politician and member-elect of the Utah House of Representatives from the 43rd district. A Democrat, she was elected in 2026.

== Early life and career ==
Matagi was born and raised in West Valley City, Utah, and is Tongan American. She serves as executive director of Utah Pacific Islander Health Coalition, a nonprofit advocating to improve health disparities impacting Pacific Islanders, and works as the environmental partnership manager for the University of Utah's University Neighborhood Partners.

== Utah House of Representatives ==
In 2020, Matagi first ran for the Utah House of Representatives in the 33rd district. She was defeated by Fatima Dirie in the Democratic primary election.

In 2026, Matagi again ran for the Utah House of Representatives, defeating Republican incumbent Steve Eliason in the 43rd district.
