= Okerlund =

Okerlund is a surname. Notable people with the surname include:

- Clinton Okerlund, American politician
- Gene Okerlund (1942–2019), American wrestling announcer and former wrestler
- Ralph Okerlund (1952–2024), American politician
- Todd Okerlund (born 1964), American ice hockey player
