= Robert Spendlove =

American politician

Member of the Utah House of Representatives
- In office January 9, 2014 – December 31, 2024
- Preceded by: Derek Brown
- Succeeded by: Clinton Okerlund
- Constituency: 49th district (2014–2023); 42nd district (2023–2024)

Personal details
- Party: Republican
- Education: University of Utah
- Website: robertspendloveutah.com

Robert Spendlove is an American politician and a former Republican member of the Utah House of Representatives representing District 42. He lives with his wife in Sandy, Utah.

== Early life and education ==
Spendlove received an M.P.A. from the University of Utah.

== Political career ==
Spendlove previously served as the Deputy Chief of Staff for Federal Relations for Governor Gary Herbert. He also served as the Washington, DC representative for the Utah Governor's Office, acting as a liaison between the State of Utah and a variety of multi-state and federal organizations, including the National Governors Association (NGA), Republican Governors Association (RGA), and the Western Governors Association (WGA), as well as Congress, federal agencies, and the White House. He has served previously as the Chair of the Governor's Council of Economic Advisers, Chair of the Utah Population Estimates Committee, and as the President of the Wasatch Front Economic Forum.

During the 2016 legislative session, Robert served on the House Economic and Workforce Services Committee, Social Services Appropriations Subcommittee, and the House Health and Human Services Committee.

== 2016 sponsored legislation ==
Bill	Status
HB 280- Autonomous Vehicle Study	Governor signed - 3/23/16
HB 290 - Campaign Finance Reform Amendments	Governor signed - 3/30/16
HB 411 - Utah Medicaid Reform Amendments	House/ filed - 3/10/16
HB 426- Child Support Regarding Rape Offenders	House/ filed - 3/10/16

Spendlove floor sponsored SB 171 Economic Development Tax Credit Amendments and SCR 16 Concurrent Resolution on Utah's Vision for Enduring Contribution to the Common Defense.

== Elections ==
- Spendlove was appointed on January 9, 2014 to replace Derek Brown.
- 2014 Spendlove was unopposed in the June Republican Convention and won the November 4, 2014 General election against Democratic nominee Zach Robinson with 6,575 votes (56.9%).
