= Sheldon Birch =

American politician

Member-elect of the Utah House of Representatives from the 29th district
- Assuming office January 1, 2027
- Succeeding: Bridger Bolinder

Personal details
- Party: Republican
- Website: Campaign website

Sheldon Birch is an American politician. A member of the Republican Party, he is the member-elect for the 29th district of the Utah House of Representatives. He was elected at the 2026 election.
