= Jake Sawyer =

American politician

Member of the Utah House of Representatives from the 9th district
- Incumbent
- Assumed office January 1, 2025
- Preceded by: Cal Musselman
- Succeeded by: Angela Choberka (elect)

Personal details
- Party: Republican
- Website: www.jakeforweber.com

Jake Sawyer is an American politician. He serves as a Republican member for the 9th district in the Utah House of Representatives since 2025. His district covers portions of central Ogden, northern Roy and the city of West Haven. Sawyer is a lifelong resident of Weber County and a graduate of Bonneville High School. At the 2026 election he was re-challenged by Angela Choberka.

== Electoral record ==
2024 Utah House of Representatives election, District 9
Party	Candidate	Votes	%
Republican	Jake Sawyer	9,497	58.3
Democratic	Angela Choberka	5,996	36.8
Libertarian	Jacob Johnson	799	4.9
Total votes		16,292	100
