= Zane Woolstenhulme =

American politician

Member-elect of the Utah House of Representatives from the 4th district
- Assuming office January 2027
- Succeeding: Tiara Auxier

Mayor of Oakley, Utah
- In office 2022–2025
- Succeeded by: Steve Wilmoth

Personal details
- Party: Democratic
- Education: University of Utah (BA)

Zane Woolstenhulme is an American politician. A Democrat, he served as the mayor of Oakley, Utah from 2022 to 2025, and is a member-elect of the Utah House of Representatives from the 4th district.

== Career ==
Outside of politics, Woolstenhulme has worked as the business administrator for the Ogden School District since 2014, and formerly worked as the business administrator for the South Summit School District.

Woolstenhulme was a member of the Oakley Planning Commission from 1989 to 2008. He was elected as mayor of Oakley in 2022. He ran for re-election in 2025, but lost to Oakley city councilman Steve Wilmoth.

On January 8, 2026, Woolstenhulme announced his campaign for district 4 of the Utah House of Representatives. He defeated Republican incumbent Tiara Auxier in the general election.

== Education ==
Woolstenhulme attended Ricks College (today known as Brigham Young University-Idaho) and Brigham Young University. He graduated from the University of Utah in 1981 with a Bachelor's degree in accounting.
