= Paul Ray =

American politician

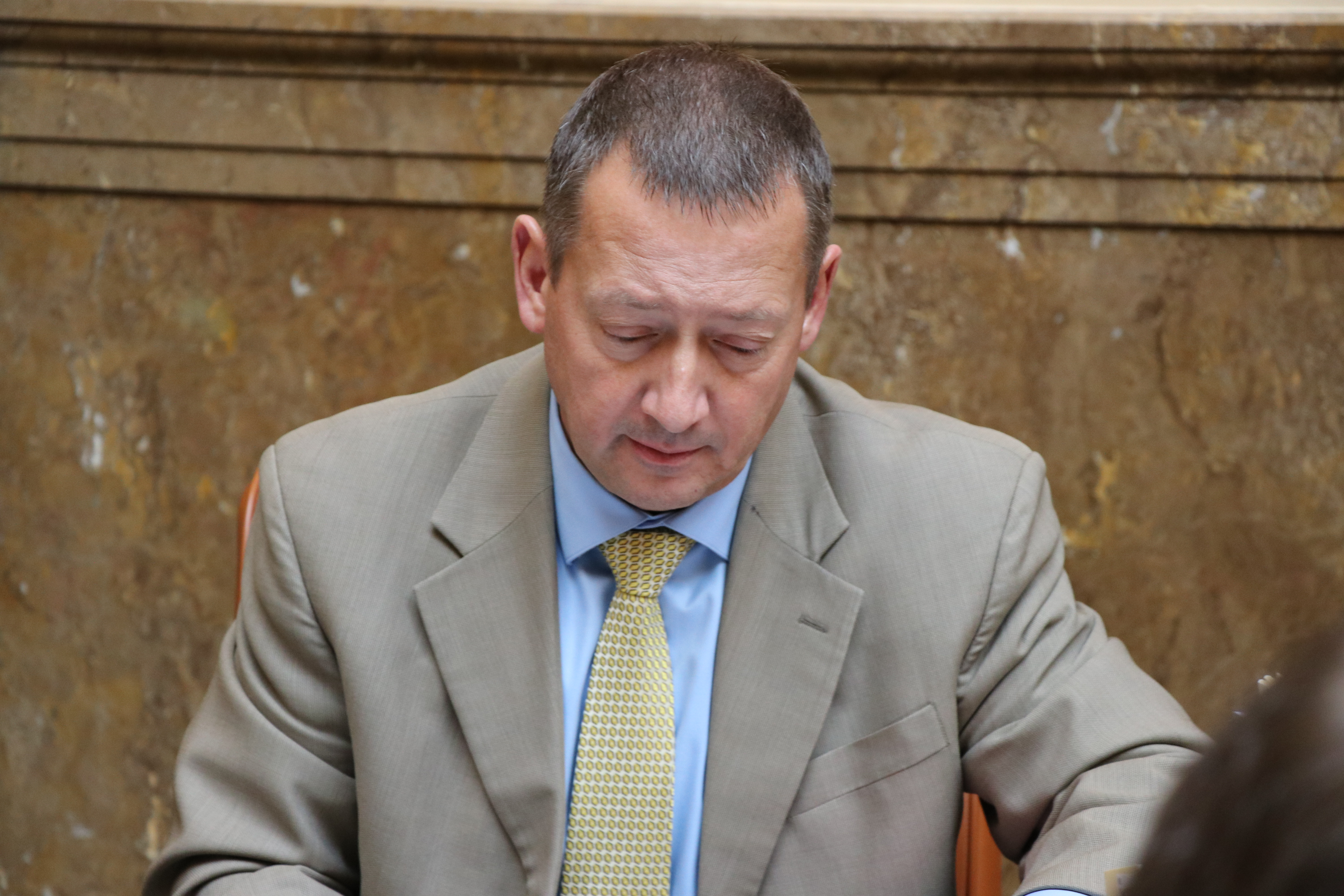

Member of the Utah House of Representatives from the 13th district
- In office January 1, 2005 – December 15, 2021
- Preceded by: Dana C. Love
- Succeeded by: Karen Peterson
- In office January 1, 2001 – December 31, 2002
- Succeeded by: Dana C. Love

Member of Clinton City Council
- In office 2002–2005

Personal details
- Born: October 25, 1966 (age 59) Peru, Indiana, U.S.
- Party: Republican
- Website: www.paulray.org

Paul Ray is an American businessman, politician, and former law enforcement officer who served as a member of the Utah House of Representatives. A member of the Republican Party, Ray represented the 13th district covering a portion of Davis County, Utah.

== Early life and education ==
Ray was born in Peru, Indiana. He graduated from Peru High School in 1985 and took medicine courses at Indiana University Bloomington from 1985 to 1988.

== Career ==
Ray served as a police officer from 1987 to 1988 and also as the branch manager of a bank from 1988 to 1995. He works as the CEO for the Northern Wasatch Home Builders Association.

=== Politics ===
Ray was a candidate for the Utah House of Representatives in 1998 but was not elected. He joined the Utah House in 2001 and served in that position until 2003. He ran unsuccessfully for re-election in 2002. He was elected on November 2, 2004, and last elected in 2014.

Ray championed a 2019 law that prevents cities from setting up citizen review boards to oversee local police departments.

In 2021, Ray defended a gerrymandered redistricting map proposal that was heavily tilted in favor of Republicans. The map broke up Utah's liberal urban areas, thus benefiting Republicans. Ray defended the proposed boundaries as "a good balance of urban-rural mix." In a 2023 lawsuit the Utah Supreme Court questioned the legitimacy of the Congressional map as it did not adhere to the ballot initiative passed by voters. A district court in 2025 struck down the approved Congressional Districts Map replacing it with a different committee map.

Ray resigned as a representative on December 15, 2021, to take a new role as Legislative Affairs with the Utah Department of Health and Human Services. He was replaced by Karen Peterson during a special election of the Davis County Republican Party.

== Personal life ==
Ray lives in Clinton, Utah, with his wife, Julie, and their four children.

On December 28, 2021, Ray was hospitalized for a cerebral hemorrhage and underwent surgery to alleviate bleeding in the brain.
