= Lorie Fowlke =

American politician

- Fowlke in 2005

Member of the Utah House of Representatives from the 59th district
- In office January 1, 2005 – December 31, 2010
- Preceded by: Mike Thompson
- Succeeded by: Val Peterson

Personal details
- Born: March 30, 1952 (age 74) China Lake, California
- Party: Republican

Lorie Fowlke (born March 30, 1952) is an American politician who served in the Utah House of Representatives from the 59th district from 2005 to 2010.
