= Angela Choberka =

American politician

Member-elect of the Utah House of Representatives from the 9th district
- Assuming office January 1, 2027
- Succeeding: Jake Sawyer

Personal details
- Party: Democratic
- Website: Campaign website

Angela Choberka is an American politician. A member of the Democratic Party, she is the member-elect for the 9th district of the Utah House of Representatives. She unseated Republican Jake Sawyer at the 2026 election. She was a candidate in 2024. She was a member of Ogden City Council.
