= Lili Bitner =

American politician

Member-elect of the Utah House of Representatives from the 17th district
- Assuming office January 1, 2027
- Succeeding: Stewart Barlow

Personal details
- Party: Republican
- Website: Campaign website

Lili Bitner is an American politician. A member of the Republican Party, she is the member-elect for the 17th district of the Utah House of Representatives. She was elected at the 2026 election.
