= Iva Williams =

American politician

Member-elect of the Utah House of Representatives from the 42nd district
- Assuming office January 1, 2027
- Succeeding: Clinton Okerlund

Personal details
- Party: Democratic
- Website: Campaign website

Iva Williams is an American politician. A member of the Democratic Party, she is the member-elect for the 42nd district of the Utah House of Representatives. She was elected at the 2026 election. She was previously a candidate for Sandy City Council.
