= Hoang Nguyen =

Vietnamese-American politician

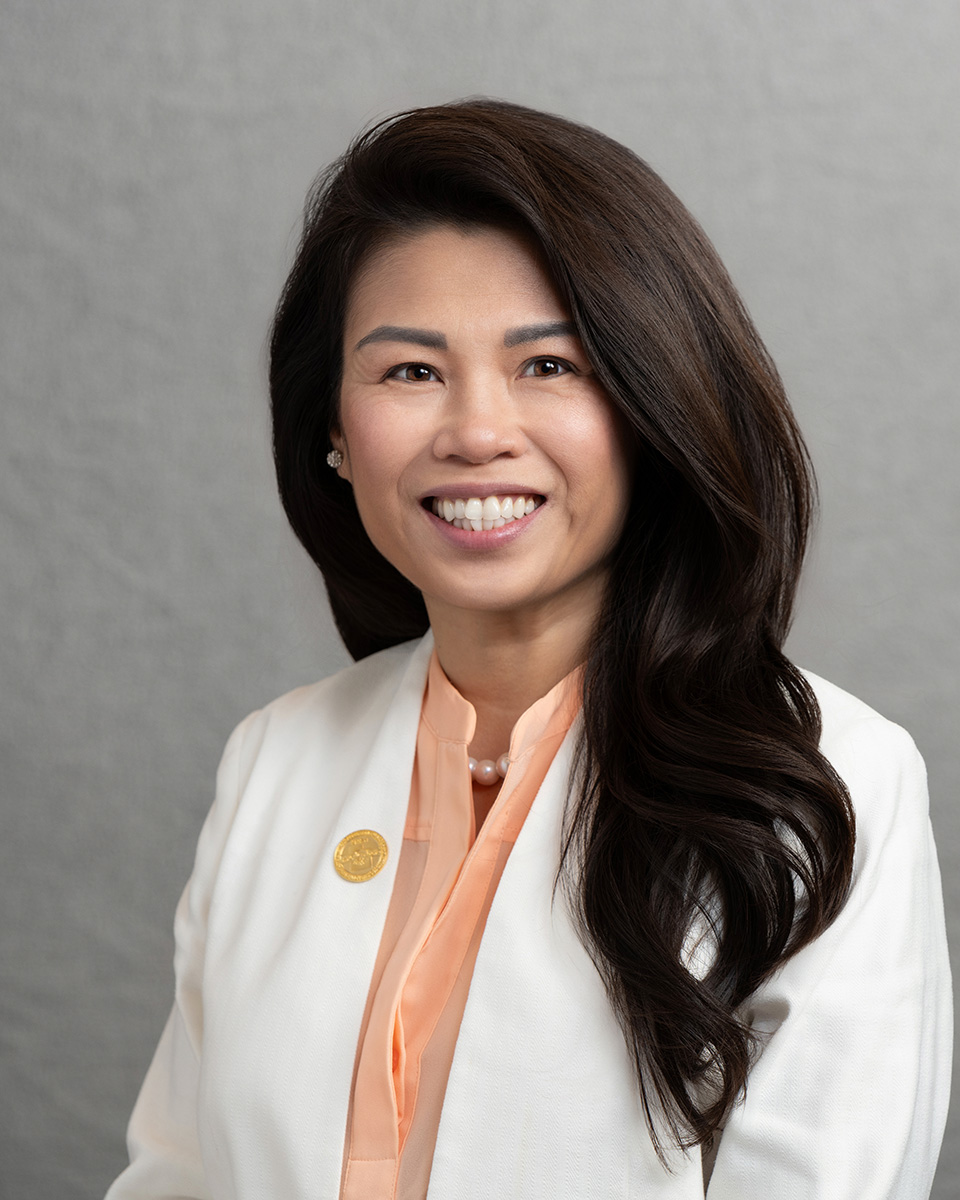

Member of the Utah House of Representatives from the 23rd district
- Incumbent
- Assumed office January 1, 2025
- Preceded by: Brian King

Personal details
- Born: Vietnam
- Party: Democratic
- Education: University of Utah; Stevens–Henager College

Hoang Nguyen is a Vietnamese-American politician. She serves as a Democratic member for the 23rd district of the Utah House of Representatives, covering part of southern Salt Lake County and a small portion of Summit County.

== Life and career ==
Nguyen was born in Vietnam. She attended the University of Utah, earning her BS degree in gender studies in 2006. She also attended Stevens–Henager College, earning her MBA degree in business administration in 2009. She has worked at an investment company and a wellness firm.

In June 2024, Nguyen defeated Jeff Howell in the Democratic primary election for the 23rd district of the Utah House of Representatives. In November 2024, she defeated Scott Romney and Cabot Nelson in the general election, winning 71 percent of the votes. She succeeded Brian King. She assumed office on January 1, 2025.

== Electoral record ==
2024 Utah House of Representatives election, District 23
Party	Candidate	Votes	%
Republican	Scott Romney	6,566	26.4
Democratic	Hoang Nguyen	17,821	71.7
United Utah	Cabot Nelson	481	1.9
