= Val Peterson (Utah politician) =

American politician

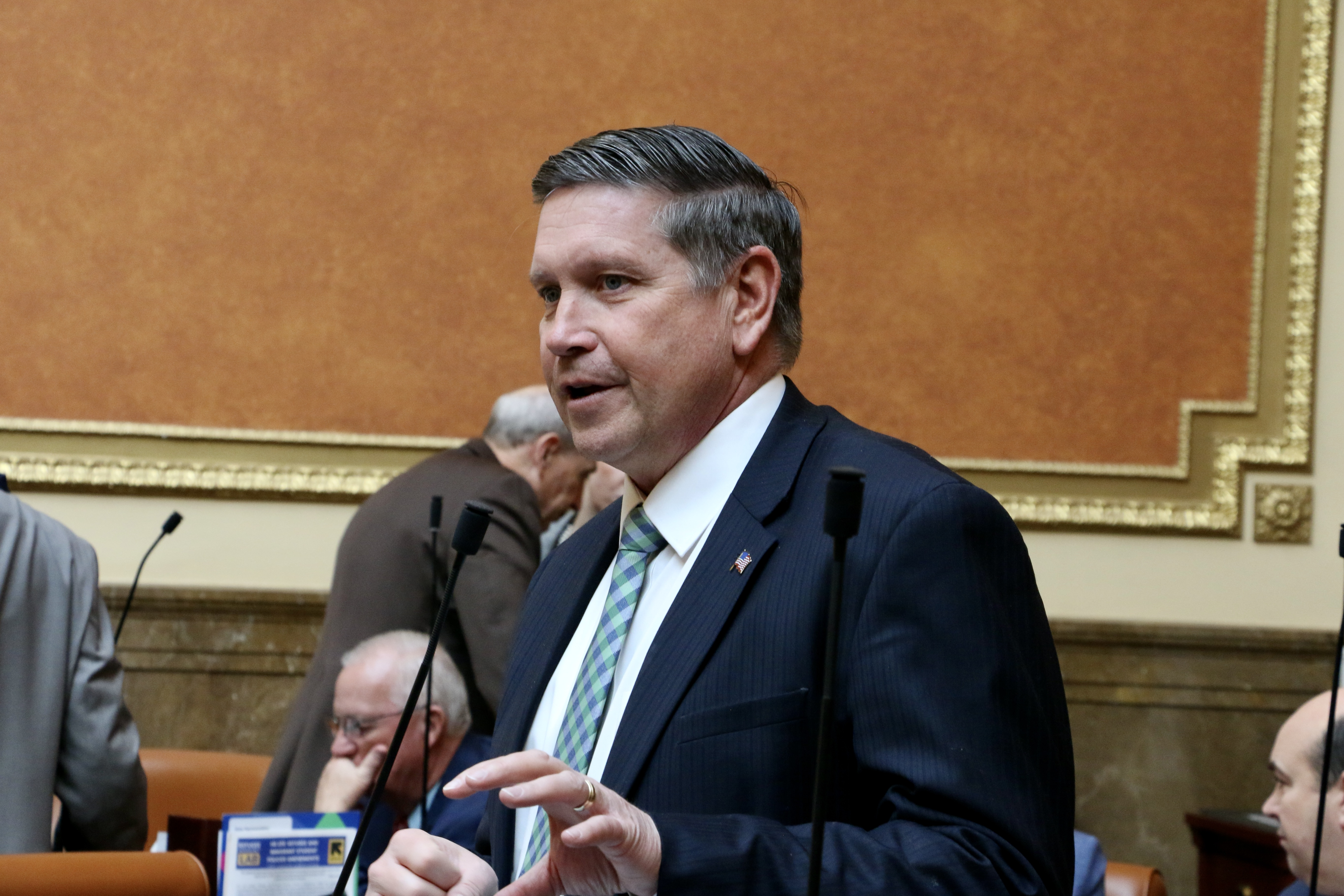
- A photo of Val Peterson of the Utah House of Representatives.

Member of the Utah House of Representatives
- Incumbent
- Assumed office January 1, 2011
- Preceded by: Lorie Fowlke
- Constituency: 59th district (2011–2023); 56th district (2023–present)

Personal details
- Party: Republican
- Education: Brigham Young University; USAWC
- Website: valpeterson.com

Military service
- Branch/service: Utah National Guard
- Rank: Brigadier General

Val L. Peterson is an American politician and a Republican member of the Utah House of Representatives representing District 56 (Orem, Utah) and lives there with his wife, Ann. He currently serves as Vice President of Administration and Legislative Affairs at Utah Valley University.

== Early life and education ==
Peterson earned his BA in communications and public relations, his MA in mass communications, and his PhD in educational leadership from Brigham Young University, and his MS in strategic studies from the United States Army War College.

== Political career ==
During the 2022 legislative session, Peterson served on the House Business, Economic Development, and Labor Appropriations Subcommittee, Executive Appropriations Committee, House Education Committee, House Government Operations Committee, and the Legislative Management Committee. Peterson was first elected on November 2, 2010.

== Notable legislation ==
- 2022: Representative Peterson ran HB 242 which addressed secondary water metering and imposed requirements related to metering pressurized secondary water sources.
- 2022: Representative Peterson ran HB 355 which changes the Public Safety Officer Career Advancement Reimbursement Program to a grant program and addressed the amount of money the Utah Board of Higher Education may use for administrative costs and overhead related to the Opportunity Scholarship Program.

== 2022 sponsored legislation ==
Bill	Status
HB 103- Student Intervention Early Warning Program	House/ to Governor 3/10/22
HB 242- Secondary Water Metering Amendments	House/ to Governor 3/10/22
HB 291- Real Estate Interest Termination Amendments	House/ to Governor 3/10/22
HB 303- Local Land Use Amendments	House/ enrolled bill to Printing 3/11/22
HB 355- Higher Education Financial Aid Amendments	House/ enrolled bill to Printing 3/11/22
HB 360- Title 39a - National Guard and Militia Act	House/ sent for enrolling 3/3/2022
HB 416- Property Rights Ombudsman Amendments	House/ filed 3/4/22

Peterson also floor sponsored SB 12 Property Tax Appeals Process Amendments, SB 15 Department of Government Operations, SB 92 Project Entity Oversight Modifications, SB 100 Paid Leave Modifications, SB 172 Higher Education Student Assistance Amendments, SB 174 Pollution Control Equipment Tax Amendments, SB 211 Income Tax Fund Amendments, SB 232 Military Installation Development Authority Revisions, SB 233 Military Servicemember Child Enrollment, and SB 258 Rocky Mountain Center for Occupational and Environmental Health Amendments.

== Elections ==
- 2014 Peterson was unopposed for both the primary election and the general election held on November 4, 2014.
- 2012 Peterson was unopposed for the June 26, 2012 Republican Primary and won the three-way November 6, 2012 general election with 9,971 votes (85.3%) against Libertarian candidate Kenny Barlow and Constitution candidate Benjamin Norton.
- 2010 When District 59 incumbent Republican Representative Lorie Fowlke left the Legislature and left the seat open, Peterson won the June 22, 2010 Republican primary with 1,417 votes (61%) against former Representative Mike Thompson and won the November 2, 2010 General election with 4,376 votes (82.6%) against Democratic nominee James Greer.
