= Celeste Johnson (politician) =

American politician

Member of the Utah House of Representatives from the 59th district
- Member-elect
- Assumed office January 1, 2027
- Preceded by: Mike Kohler

Personal details
- Party: Democratic
- Website: Campaign website

Celeste T. Johnson is an American politician. A member of the Democratic Party, she was elected to the Utah House of Representatives in 2026, representing the 59th district.

Johnson served two terms as mayor of Midway, Utah, after working as a citizen activist focused on conservationist efforts. In January 2026, she announced her candidacy for the Utah House's 59th district to succeed Mike Kohler, the Republican incumbent, who had announced his retirement the month before. Johnson secured the Democratic nomination at the Utah Democratic Party nominating convention in April. She then defeated Republican Luke Searle in the general election in November.
