= 2016 Utah Senate election =

- November 8, 2016

15 of the 29 seats in the Utah State Senate 15 seats needed for a majority
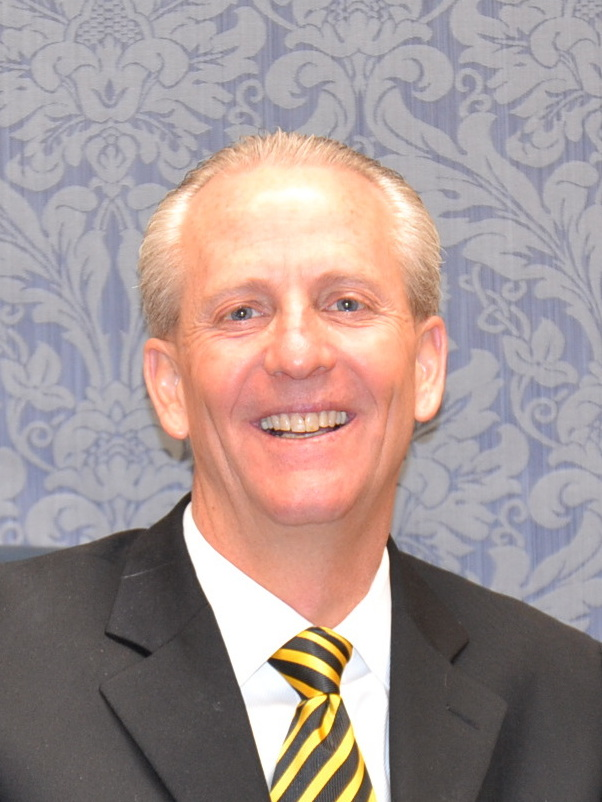

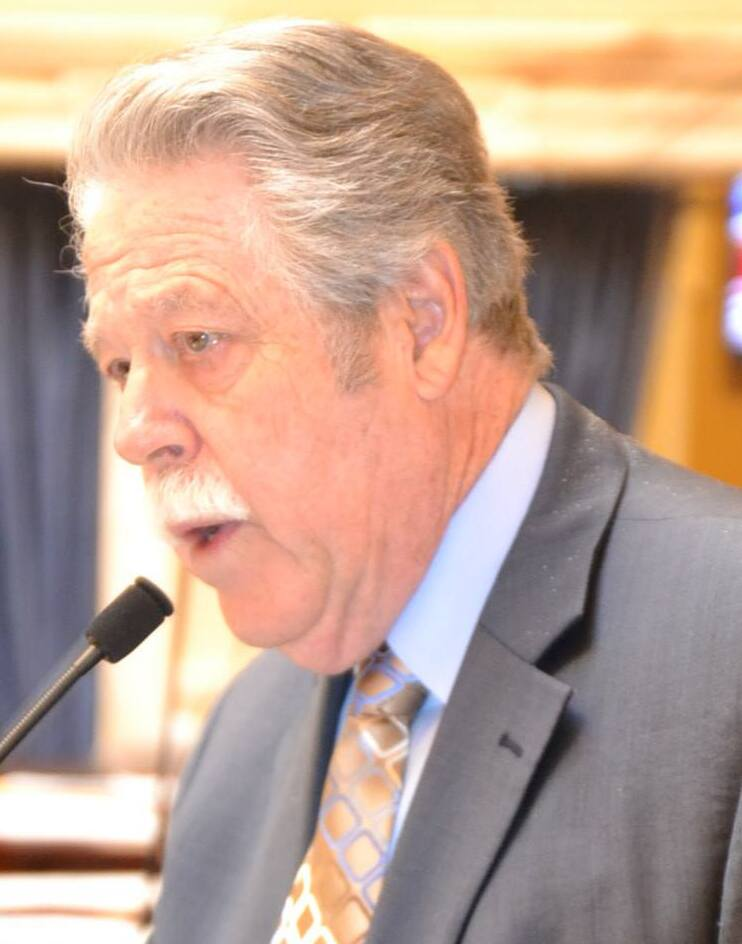
	Majority party	Minority party
Leader	Wayne L. Niederhauser	Gene Davis
Party	Republican	Democratic
Leader's seat	9th District	3rd District
Seats before	23	6
Seats after	24	5
Seat change	▲1	▼1
Popular vote	404,023	123,078
Percentage	74.82%	22.79%
- Results: Republican gain Republican hold Democratic hold
President of the Senate before election
Wayne L. Niederhauser
Republican
Elected President of the Senate
Wayne L. Niederhauser
Republican

The 2016 Utah Senate election was held on November 8, 2016. Fifteen Senate seats were up for election. Prior to the election, the Republicans held a majority.

== Overview ==
Affiliation	Candidates	Votes	Vote %	Seats Won	Seats After
Republican	15	404,023	74.82%	14 (▲1)	24
Democratic	10	123,078	22.79%	1	5
Independent American	2	6,824	1.26%	0	
Libertarian	2	6,042	1.12%	0 (▼1)	
Total	29	539,967	100%	15	29

== Predictions ==
Source	Ranking	As of
Governing	Safe R	October 12, 2016

== Results ==
The election took place on November 8, 2016. Candidate list and results from the Lieutenant Governor of Utah.

District	Party	Incumbent	Status	Party	Candidate	Votes	%
1	Democratic	Luz Escamilla		Democratic	Luz Escamilla	11,957	58.8%
1	Democratic	Luz Escamilla		Republican	Fred C. Johnson	8,372	41.2%
6	Republican	Wayne Harper		Republican	Wayne Harper	19,325	56.4%
6	Republican	Wayne Harper		Democratic	Celina Milner	12,682	37%
6	Republican	Wayne Harper		Libertarian	Jim Dexter	2,266	6.6%
7	Republican	Deidre Henderson		Republican	Deidre Henderson	28,592	83.6%
7	Republican	Deidre Henderson		Democratic	Andrew Apsley	5,589	16.4%
8	Republican	Brian Shiozawa		Republican	Brian Shiozawa	23,533	57.2%
8	Republican	Brian Shiozawa		Democratic	Ash Anderson	17,577	42.8%
10	Republican	Lincoln Fillmore		Republican	Lincoln Fillmore	31,762	70.3%
10	Republican	Lincoln Fillmore		Democratic	Dan Paget	13,442	29.7%
13	Libertarian	Mark B. Madsen		Republican	Jake Anderegg	39,094	100%
14	Republican	Alvin B. Jackson		Republican	Dan Hemmert	34,681	86.3%
14	Republican	Alvin B. Jackson		Libertarian	Joe Buchman	3,776	9.4%
14	Republican	Alvin B. Jackson		Independent American	Curt Crosby	1,732	4.3%
16	Republican	Curtis Bramble		Republican	Curtis Bramble	21,489	80.8%
16	Republican	Curtis Bramble		Independent American	Jason Christensen	5,092	19.2%
19	Republican	Allen M. Christensen		Republican	Allen Christensen	20,994	56.2%
19	Republican	Allen M. Christensen		Democratic	Deana Froerer	16,381	43.8%
20	Republican	Scott K. Jenkins		Republican	Gregg Buxton	24,296	69.3%
20	Republican	Scott K. Jenkins		Democratic	Alan Yorgason	10,757	30.7%
23	Republican	Todd Weiler		Republican	Todd Weiler	29,883	68.2%
23	Republican	Todd Weiler		Democratic	Steve Hartwick	13,953	31.8%
24	Republican	Ralph Okerlund		Republican	Ralph Okerlund	33,338	100%
25	Republican	Lyle W. Hillyard		Republican	Lyle W. Hillyard	30,288	100%
27	Republican	David Hinkins		Republican	David Hinkins	26,199	69.3%
27	Republican	David Hinkins		Democratic	Heidi Redd	11,626	30.7%
29	Republican	Stephen H. Urquhart		Republican	Don Ipson	32,177	77.9%
29	Republican	Stephen H. Urquhart		Democratic	Dorothy Engelman	9,114	22.1%

== See also ==
- Utah Senate
- Utah Legislature
- Utah elections, 2016
