= Tracy Miller =

American painter (born 1966)

Tracy Miller (born 1966) is an American painter. Her large-scale still life paintings of food have been included in more than ten solo shows and more than seventy group shows throughout the United States since 1992. In 2013 her work was the subject of a solo exhibition at the American University Museum and was accompanied by a catalog published by Feature Inc. She was awarded a Guggenheim Fellowship in 2014. She lives and works in Brooklyn, New York.

== Early life and education ==
Miller was born in Storm Lake, IA She studied at the University of Iowa (BFA 1989), the Skowhegan School of Painting and Sculpture (ME 1992), and the University of California at Berkeley (MFA 1993).

== Work ==
Miller is best known for her exuberant still life paintings of food that utilize a “vast array of techniques, including a sign painter’s folk realism, a loose, sketchy cartoonist’s stroke, and a Pollock drip” that come together in “chaotic buffets in oil." Miller paints what she calls, “piles of guilty pleasure” and her work has been described as a “vibrating cacophony of heady color.” A May 2004 review in Art in America stated, “Miller’s paintings teem with as much activity and information as it seems they can bear, deliberately flirting with surfeit. Painterly abstraction is at least as integral to these works as their still-life components are, and their dizzying visual generosity underlines the symbiotic relationship between food and paint, and the inherently sustaining nature of both.” Her influences include Goya, Florine Stettheimer, Cézanne, van Gogh and Fairfield Porter.

== Collections ==
Miller’s work is in the collections of the American University Museum at the Katzen Arts Center, the Daum Museum of Contemporary Art, Deutsche Bank, the John Simon Guggenheim Memorial Foundation, Microsoft, SEI/West Family Collection, and the Sioux City Art Center.

== Reviews and commentary ==
“There’s a sensuality in Miller’s work that is at times breathtaking, and thus a painting of a simple row of doughnuts provokes a visceral, joyful response that’s not easily forgotten.” —Kristin Iversen, Brooklyn Magazine

“Subtly situating her goodies among raucous candy-colored dabs of luscious paint, Miller strikes an unlikely balance among Technicolor Pop consumerist extravaganza, messy all-over abstraction, and sumptuous Old Master still life. If her beloved beer cans and bonbons appear lighthearted, her well-conceived compositions never fail to convey her seriousness as a painter.” —Meredith Mendelsohn, Art + Auction

"Tracy Miller emerges as a kind of Huysmanian painter of contemporary life. She makes paintings that flirt with conventions of landscape, still-life, abstraction, and representation, but refuse the autonomy of any one of them—sampling at will and combining with unexpected alchemical results. She fills the canvas much in the way Huysman fills a room: with paradoxically united elements, raging alcholates that threaten to overwhelm, to subsume, to tip into the noxious, and which offer sensations more extreme than any that come to us purely by way of nature. There is a frantic, concentrated pleasure here, one that hints at the neurotic monstrousness produced by so many consumable goods. Yet the poker-faced humor of Miller’s works, packed as they are with fish and donuts and hotdogs and bananas and pie (so many potential allusions to ever-more guilty pleasures), render the works complicated and ambivalent—at once clamorous and mute." —Johanna Burton, Feature Inc

“Canvases brimming with colors, animals, flowers and comestible items like pineapple upside-down cake seem like convergences of fantasies through paint.” —TimeOut New York

== Awards and honors ==
Miller has received numerous awards, including a Guggenheim Fellowship, three Pollock-Krasner Foundation Awards, an Elizabeth Foundation Award, a Marie Walsh Sharpe Art Foundation Grant, and an American Academy of Arts and Letters purchase prize.
