= Karen M. Peterson =

Utah Legislative Representative of the 13th District

Karen Peterson
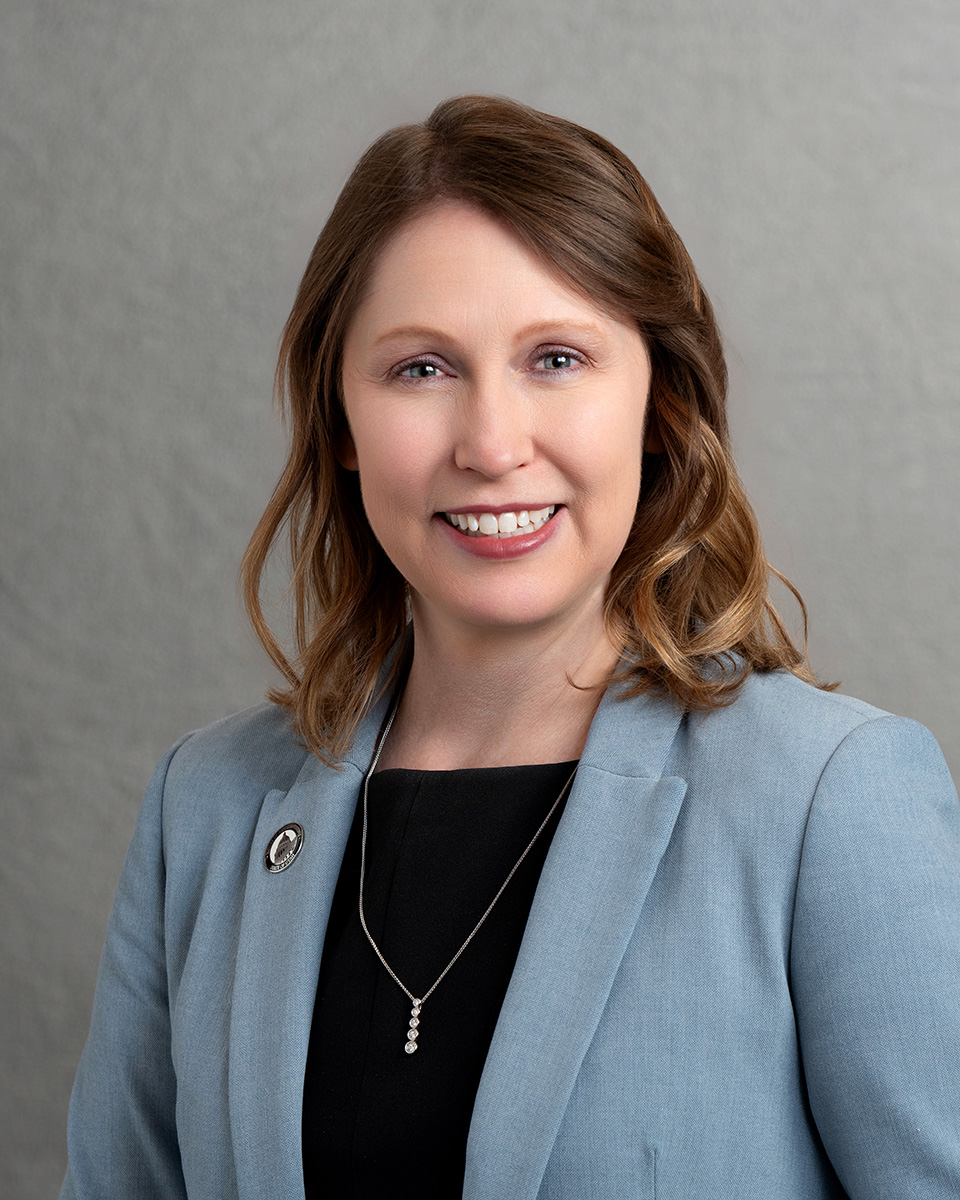

Member of the Utah House of Representatives from the 13th district
- Incumbent
- Assumed office January 5, 2022
- Preceded by: Paul Ray
- Succeeded by: John Taylor (elect)

Member of Clinton City Council
- In office January 2014 – December 2020

Personal details
- Party: Republican
- Education: Southern Utah University
- Website: electkarenpeterson.com

Karen M. Peterson is an American politician serving as a member of the Utah House of Representatives. As a member of the Republican Party, Peterson represents the 13th district, which covers a portion of Davis County, Utah.

== Early life and education ==
Peterson studied at Utah State University graduating in 2002 with a B.A. in Political Science. She then went to Southern Utah University to receive a M.P.A. in State and Local Government, graduating in 2016.

Karen is a cancer survivor and gave her insights to Deseret News.

== Career ==
=== Politics ===
Peterson was elected a member of the Clinton City Council in 2013. She resigned in 2020 after being selected as Legislative Liaison for Governor Spencer Cox.

After Paul Ray resigned on December 15, 2021, Peterson was elected during a special election of the Davis County Republican Party.

Peterson announced on December 30, 2025 that she will not seek re-election for the upcoming 2026 election.

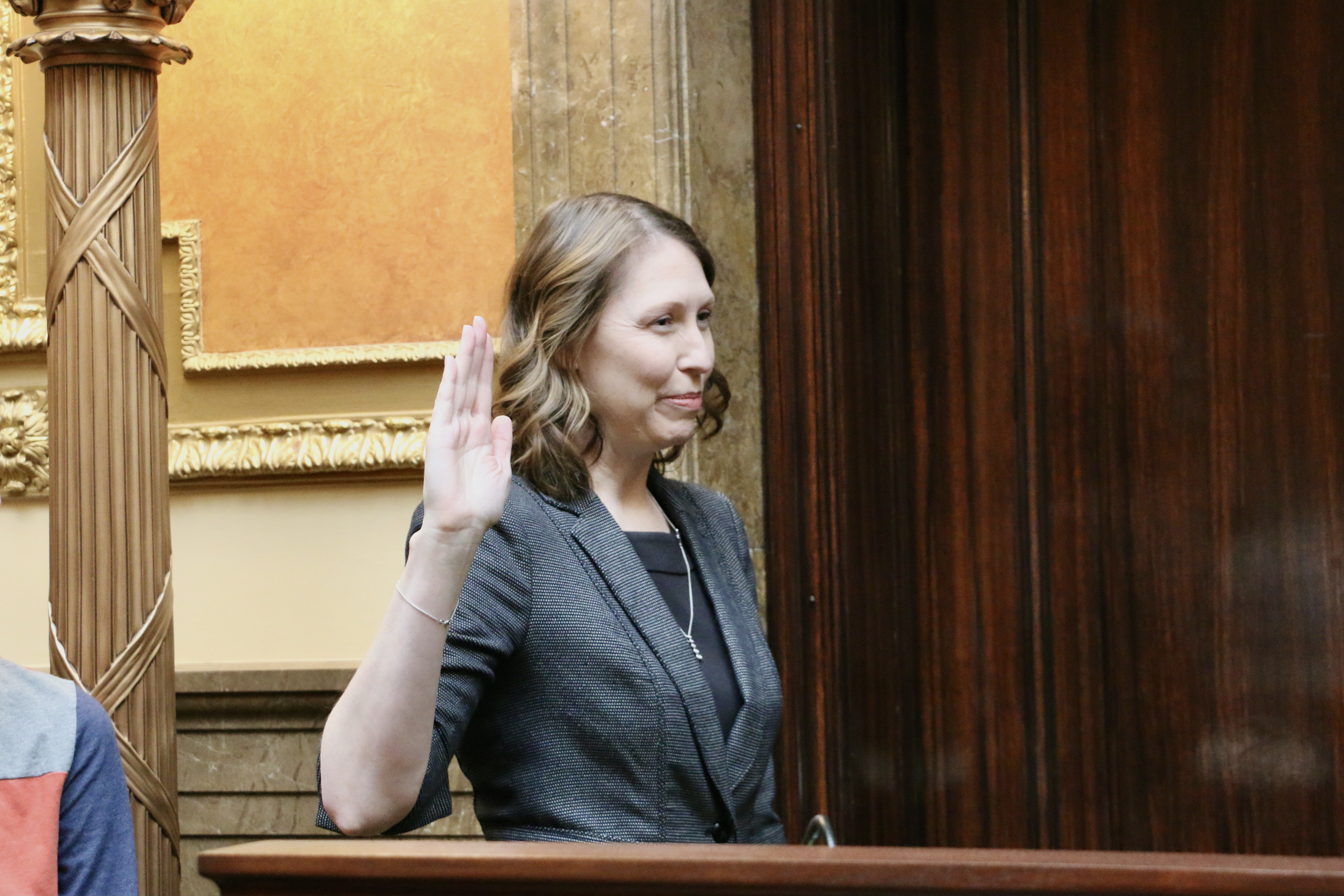
Karen Peterson taking oath of office

==== Current Committees ====
Representative Peterson's current committees are:

- Education Interim Committee
- Higher Education Appropriations Subcommittee
- House Education Committee
- House Political Subdivisions Committee
- House Rules Committee (Vice Chair)
- Transportation Interim Committee

==== Previous Committees ====
Previous committees that Representative Peterson has served:

- Health and Human Services Interim Committee
- House Health and Human Services Committee
- House Transportation Committee
- Social Services Appropriations Subcommittee

==== Election Results ====
2022 Utah State House of Representatives Election District 13
Party	Candidate	Votes	%
Republican	Karen Peterson	7,291	61.5%
Democratic	Tab Lyn Uno	4,571	38.5%

2024 Utah State House of Representatives Election District 13
Party	Candidate	Votes	%
Republican	Karen Peterson	12,391	71.9%
Democratic	Lorri Rogers	4,854	28.2%

==== Bill Sponsored Legislation ====
This is the bill sponsored legislation during the general session of the Utah Legislature. All sponsored legislation can be found at https://le.utah.gov

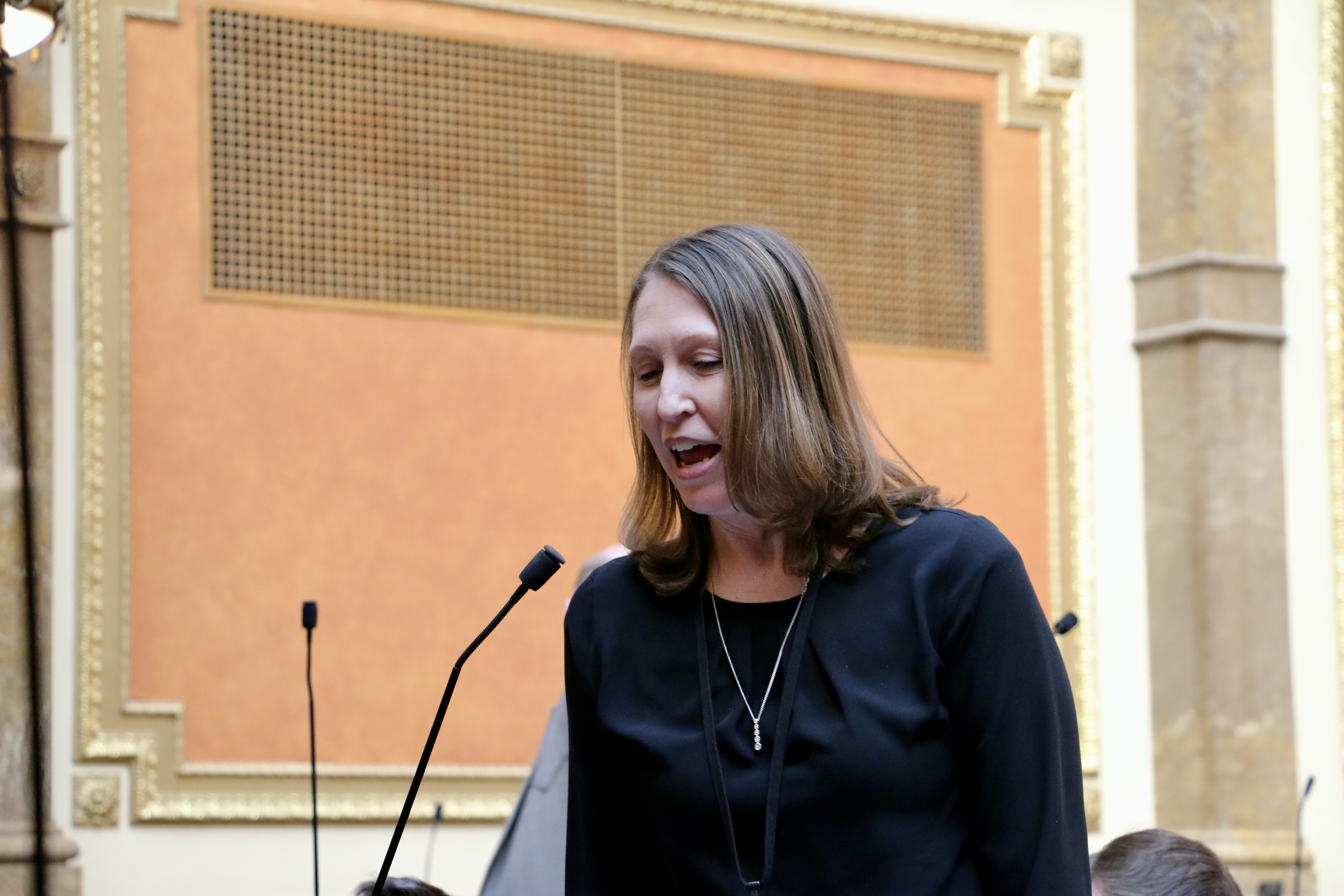
Representative Peterson discussing a bill

2022 Legislation
Bill	Status
HB0251 School Dropout Prevention Amendments	signed by the Governor 3/24/22
HB0270 Parent Access to School Data Comparison	signed by the Governor 3/24/22
HB0290 School Readiness Amendments	signed by the Governor 3/24/22
HB0419 Audit Committee Authority Amendments	signed by the Governor 3/24/22

2023 Legislation
Bill	Status
HB0049 Motor Vehicle Safety Inspection Advisory Council Amendments	signed by the Governor 3/13/23
HB0071 Local Health Department Revisions	signed by the Governor 3/15/23
HB0169 Urban Farming Assessment Act Amendments	signed by the Governor 3/14/23
HB0249 Education Related Information Amendments	signed by the Governor 3/13/23
HB0345 Local District Property Tax Amendments	signed by the Governor 3/14/23
HB0394 Grant Funding for Supplemental Educational Opportunities	signed by the Governor 3/14/23
HB0411 Student Behavioral Health Services Amendments	signed by the Governor 3/17/23
HB0445 Vehicle Tracking Amendments	House file for bills not passed
HB0478 Educator Evaluation Pilot Program	House file for bills not passed

2024 Legislation
Bill	Status
HB0050 State Highway Designation Amendments	signed by the Governor 3/20/24
HB0221 Stipends for Future Educators	signed by the Governor 3/20/24
HB0286 State Aid for Scholarships	signed by the Governor 3/12/24
HB0367 Local Government Fees Modifications	House file for bills not passed
HB0438 Higher Education Revisions	signed by the Governor 3/12/24
HB0515 Election Administration Modifications	signed by the Governor 3/21/24
HB0533 Small School District Scale of Operations Formula	House file for bills not passed
HB0546 Public Education Modifications	House file for bills not passed
HB0575 Urban Farming Assessment Amendments	House file for bills not passed

2025 Legislation
Bill	Status
HB0001 Higher Education Base Budget	signed by the Governor 2/14/25
HB0026 Road Jurisdiction Amendments	signed by the Governor 3/26/25
HB0043 Education Program Sunset Amendments	signed by the Governor 3/25/25
HB0051 Higher Education Reporting Amendments	signed by the Governor 3/26/25
HB0204 Stipends for Future Educators Grant Program Amendments	signed by the Governor 3/26/25
HB0265 Higher Education Strategic Reinvestment	signed by the Governor 3/26/25
HB0396 Small School District Scale of Operations Formula	signed by the Governor 3/24/25
HB0454 Local Government Fees Modifications	House file for bills not passed
HB0530 Utah Innovation Lab Modifications	signed by the Governor 3/27/25
HB0545 School District Governance Agreements	signed by the Governor 3/27/25

2026 Legislation
Bill	Status
HB0143 Special Education Amendments	signed by the Governor 3/19/26
HB0236 Truth in Taxation Amendments	signed by the Governor 3/23/26
HB0242 Initiative and Referendum Signature Gathering and Removal Amendments	signed by the Governor 3/7/26
HB0352 Higher Education Alignment	signed by the Governor 3/19/26
HB0373 Higher Education Innovation	signed by the Governor 3/18/26
HB0425 Local Government Fees Amendments	signed by the Governor 3/24/26

=== Other work ===
After being elected in December, Peterson started work in January as the Community Development Manager for Sunrise Engineering.
