= Clinton Okerlund =

American politician

Member of the Utah House of Representatives from the 42nd district
- Incumbent
- Assumed office January 1, 2025
- Preceded by: Robert Spendlove
- Succeeded by: Iva Williams (elect)

Personal details
- Party: Republican
- Education: Brigham Young University; University of Notre Dame
- Website: www.electclint.com

Clinton (Clint) Okerlund is an American politician. He serves as a Republican member for the 42nd district in the Utah House of Representatives since 2025. In the 2024 election he was elected over Democratic Party candidate Travis Smith.

== Electoral record ==
2024 Utah House of Representatives election, District 42
Party	Candidate	Votes	%
Republican	Clint Okerlund	13,557	54.5
Democratic	Travis Smith	11,303	45.5
Total votes		24,860	100
