= Steve Eliason =

American politician

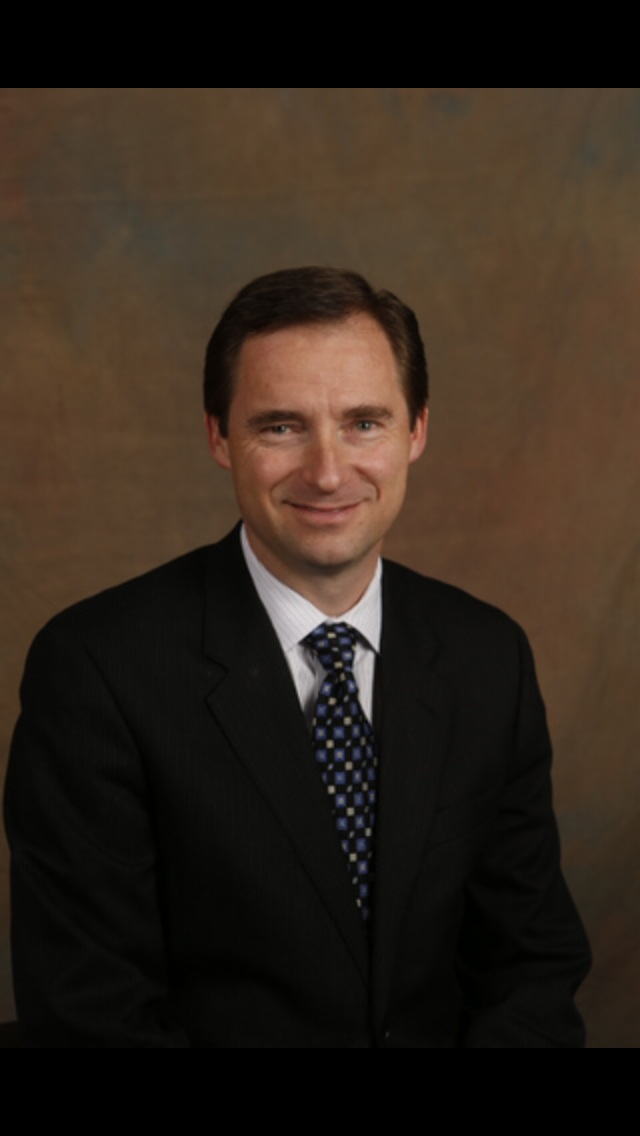

Member of the Utah House of Representatives
- Incumbent
- Assumed office January 1, 2011
- Preceded by: Laura Black
- Constituency: 45th district (2011–2023); 43rd district (2023–present)

Personal details
- Party: Republican
- Education: University of Utah
- Profession: Certified public accountant
- Website: www.steveforutahhouse.com

Steven 'Steve' Eliason is an American politician and a Republican member of the Utah House of Representatives representing District 43, which covers a part of southern Salt Lake County.

Representative Eliason routinely passes the most legislation of any member of the Utah legislature. He has been recognized as a nationwide leader on issues related to mental health and suicide prevention, homelessness, and tax policy.

== Early life and career ==
Born May 26, Eliason earned his BS in accounting and his MBA from the University of Utah. He currently works as a senior director at the University of Utah Hospital. He has lived in Sandy, Cottonwood Heights, and Midvale for all of his adult life.

== Political career ==
Representative Eliason represents a district won by Democratic nominees for President in 2016, 2020, and 2024. Despite the leftward tilt of the district, he has significant numbers of crossover voters in his bids for re-election.

=== 2024 ===
In the 2024 general election, Steve Eliason defeated Democrat Jason Barber, receiving 55.8% of the vote to Barber's 44.2%.

=== 2022 ===
Steve Eliason advanced from the Republican Convention. In the general election, he defeated Democrat Alan Anderson 57.2% to 42.8%.

=== 2020 ===
Eliason advanced from the Republican convention in 2020. He defeated Democrat Wendy Davis, earning 50.2% of the vote to Davis' 49.8%.

=== 2018 ===
Eliason ran unopposed in the 2018 general election.

=== 2016 ===
Elian ran unopposed in the 2016 Republican Primary. He defeated Democrat Nikki Cunard in the general election, earning 55.08% of the vote to Cunard's 44.92%.

=== 2014 ===
Eliason was unopposed for the June 24, 2014 Republican Primary and won the November 4, 2014 General election with 4,908 votes (58.2%) against Democratic nominee Susan Marques Booth.

=== 2012 ===
Eliason was unopposed for the June 26, 2012 Republican Primary and won the November 6, 2012 General election with 8,048 votes (55.4%) against Democratic nominee Gary Forbush.

=== 2010 ===
To challenge incumbent Democratic Representative Laura Black, Eliason was unopposed for the June 22, 2010 Republican Primary and won the three-way November 2, 2010 General election with 4,198 votes (51.4%) against Representative Black and Constitution candidate David Perry, who had run for the seat in 2008.

== Notable Legislation ==
Bill number	Title	Status	Year
HB0413	Student Mental Health Amendments	Governor Signed	2024
HB0038	Psychotropic Medication Oversight Pilot Program Amendments	Governor Signed	2024
SB0027	Behavioral Health System Amendments	Governor Signed	2024
HB0071	SafeUT and School Safety Amendments	Governor Signed	2024
HB0023	Forensic Mental Health Amendments	Governor Signed	2023
HB0499	Behavioral Health Crisis Response Amendments	Governor Signed	2023
HB0066	School Mental Health Amendments	Governor Signed	2023
HCR006	Concurrent Resolution on School Mental Health	Governor Signed	2023
HB0001	Public Education Base Budget	Governor Signed	2022
HB0236	Mental Health Professional Loan Repayment Program	Governor Signed	2022
HB0440	Utah Mental Health Crisis Line Amendments	Governor Signed	2022
HB0396	Youth Mental Health Program Amendments	Governor Signed	2022
HB0046	Suicide Prevention Program Amendments	Governor Signed	2021
HB0336	School-Based Behavioral Health Programs	Governor Signed	2021
HB0337	Expansion of Behavioral Health Services	Governor Signed	2021
HB0093	Behavioral Health Delivery System Amendments	Governor Signed	2021
SB0155	Behavioral Health Crisis Response Funding	Governor Signed	2021
SB0093	Mental Health Access Amendments	Governor Signed	2020
HB0459	School Counselor Amendments	Governor Signed	2020
HB0207	Child Mental Health Amendments	Governor Signed	2020
HB0323	Suicide Prevention in Schools Amendments	Governor Signed	2020
HB0017	Suicide Prevention Modifications	Governor Signed	2019
HB0373	School Mental Health and Safety Amendments	Governor Signed	2019

== Committee Memberships ==
Representative Steve Eliason is a member of the following committees:

- House Health and Human Services Committee
- House Revenue and Taxation Committee
- Public Education Appropriations Subcommittee
- School Security Task Force

Official Utah House of Representatives Profile

== Awards ==
Representative Eliason has been recognized for various leadership awards throughout the state.

Elected Official of the Year – Canyons School District

Outstanding Legislator Award – Utah Association of Public Health Boards

Mental Health Champion Legislative Award – Mental Health America

Friend of the Taxpayer – Utah Taxpayers Association

Public Health Hero – Utah Public Health Association

Executive Award of Merit – Utah Department of Public Safety

Allies in Action Award – American Foundation for Suicide Prevention

Business Champion Award – Salt Lake Chamber of Commerce
