= 2022 Utah House of Representatives election =

- November 8, 2022

All 75 seats in the Utah House of Representatives 38 seats needed for a majority
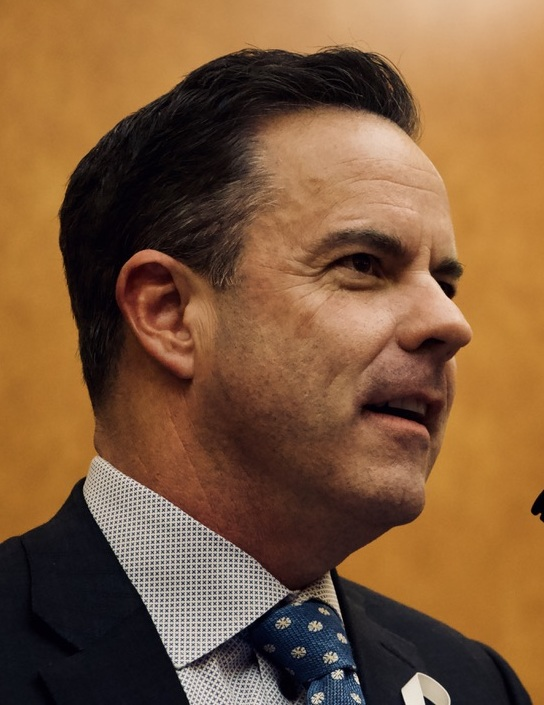

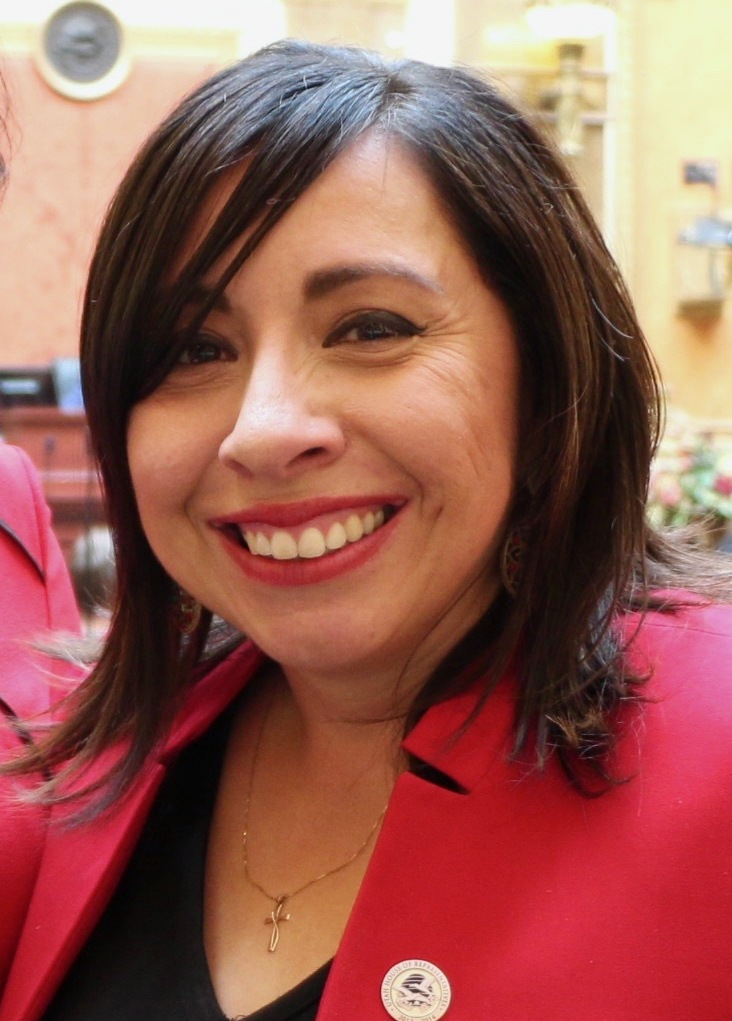
	Majority party	Minority party
Leader	Brad Wilson	Angela Romero
Party	Republican	Democratic
Leader since	January 28, 2019	January 17, 2023
Leader's seat	15–Kaysville	25–Salt Lake City
Last election	58 seats, 61.3%	17 seats, 34.1%
Seats before	58	17
Seats won	61	14
Seat change	▲3	▼3
Popular vote	692,787	250,516
Percentage	70.03%	25.32%
Swing	▲3.95%	▼4.82%
- Republican gain Republican hold Democratic hold 40–50% 50–60% 60–70% 70–80% 80–90% >90% 50–60% 60–70% 70–80% >90%
Speaker before election
Brad Wilson
Republican
Elected Speaker
Brad Wilson
Republican

The 2022 Utah House of Representatives election took place on November 8, 2022, as part of the biennial 2022 United States elections. Elections were held in 75 electoral districts to elect two-year term members to the Utah House of Representatives.

== Predictions ==
Source	Ranking	As of
Sabato's Crystal Ball	Safe R	May 19, 2022

== Results ==
=== Overview ===
Party	Candidates	Votes		Seats				
Party	Candidates	No.	%	Before	Up	Won	After	+/–
Republican	73	692,787	70.03%	58	58	61	61	▲3
Democratic	41	250,516	25.32%	17	17	14	14	▼3
United Utah	12	25,398	2.57%	0	0	0	0	Steady
Libertarian	5	6,809	0.69%	0	0	0	0	Steady
Constitution	2	4,601	0.47%	0	0	0	0	Steady
Others	1	4,081	0.41%	0	0	0	0	Steady
Write-in		5,080	0.51%	0	0	0	0	Steady
Total		989,272	100.00%	75	75	75	75	Steady

=== Close races ===
Districts where the margin of victory was under 10%:

1. District 27, 0.72% (gain)
2. District 26, 1.36% (gain)
3. District 30, 3.78%
4. District 10, 4.34%
5. District 35, 8.22%
6. District 36, 8.92%

=== District 1 ===
2022 Utah House of Representatives 1st district election
Party	Candidate	Votes	%
Republican	Joel Ferry (incumbent)	11,781	82.13%
Democratic	Joshua Hardy	2,379	16.58%
Write-In	Thomas Peterson	128	0.89%
Write-In	Ben C. Ferry	40	0.28%
Write-In	Karson Riser	17	0.12%
Total votes		14,345	100.00%

=== District 2 ===
2022 Utah House of Representatives 2nd district election
Party	Candidate	Votes	%
Republican	Mike Petersen	10,238	72.73%
Democratic	Holly Gunther	3,838	27.27%
Total votes		14,076	100.00%

=== District 3 ===
2022 Utah House of Representatives 3rd district election
Party	Candidate	Votes	%
Republican	Dan Johnson	6,194	56.58%
Democratic	Patrick Belmont	4,754	43.42%
Total votes		10,948	100.00%

=== District 4 ===
2022 Utah House of Representatives 4th district election
Party	Candidate	Votes	%
Republican	Kera Birkeland	11,257	57.66%
Democratic	Kris Campbell	8,266	42.34%
Total votes		19,523	100.00%

=== District 5 ===
2022 Utah House of Representatives 5th district election
Party	Candidate	Votes	%
Republican	Casey Snider	13,049	98.01%
Write-In	Cary J. Youmans	265	1.99%
Total votes		13,314	100.00%

=== District 6 ===
2022 Utah House of Representatives 6th district election
Party	Candidate	Votes	%
Republican	Matthew H. Gwynn	13,032	100.00%
Total votes		13,032	100.00%

=== District 7 ===
2022 Utah House of Representatives 7th district election
Party	Candidate	Votes	%
Republican	Ryan D. Wilcox	10,423	100.00%
Total votes		10,423	100.00%

=== District 8 ===
2022 Utah House of Representatives 8th district election
Party	Candidate	Votes	%
Republican	Jason B. Kyle	8,571	60.41%
Democratic	Monica Hall	5,616	39.59%
Total votes		14,187	100.00%

=== District 9 ===
2022 Utah House of Representatives 9th district election
Party	Candidate	Votes	%
Republican	Cal Musselman	6,238	62.81%
Democratic	"One" Neil Hansen	2,971	29.91%
Libertarian	Jacob K. Johnson	723	7.28%
Total votes		9,932	100.00%

=== District 10 ===
2022 Utah House of Representatives 10th district election
Party	Candidate	Votes	%
Democratic	Rosemary Lesser	5,771	52.26%
Republican	Jill Koford	5,271	47.74%
Total votes		11,042	100.00%

=== District 11 ===
2022 Utah House of Representatives 11th district election
Party	Candidate	Votes	%
Republican	Katy Hall	9,379	100.00%
Total votes		9,379	100.00%

=== District 12 ===
2022 Utah House of Representatives 12th district election
Party	Candidate	Votes	%
Republican	Mike Schultz	10,843	100.00%
Total votes		10,843	100.00%

=== District 13 ===
2022 Utah House of Representatives 13th district election
Party	Candidate	Votes	%
Republican	Karen M. Peterson	7,644	61.40%
Democratic	Tab Lyn Uno	4,806	38.60%
Total votes		12,450	100.00%

=== District 14 ===
2022 Utah House of Representatives 14th district election
Party	Candidate	Votes	%
Republican	Karianne Lisonbee	9,023	100.00%
Total votes		9,023	100.00%

=== District 15 ===
2022 Utah House of Representatives 15th district election
Party	Candidate	Votes	%
Republican	Brad Wilson	10,934	77.65%
United Utah	Ammon Gruwell	3,147	22.35%
Total votes		14,081	100.00%

=== District 16 ===
2022 Utah House of Representatives 16th district election
Party	Candidate	Votes	%
Republican	Trevor A Lee	6,375	48.63%
Write-in	Steve Handy	4,630	35.32%
Libertarian	Brent Zimmerman	2,103	16.04%
Total votes		13,108	100.00%

=== District 17 ===
2022 Utah House of Representatives 17th district election
Party	Candidate	Votes	%
Republican	Stewart E. Barlow	12,357	100.00%
Total votes		12,357	100.00%

=== District 18 ===
2022 Utah House of Representatives 18th district election
Party	Candidate	Votes	%
Republican	Paul A Cutler	12,845	100.00%
Total votes		12,845	100.00%

=== District 19 ===
2022 Utah House of Representatives 19th district election
Party	Candidate	Votes	%
Republican	Raymond P. Ward	12,822	100.00%
Total votes		12,822	100.00%

=== District 20 ===
2022 Utah House of Representatives 20th district election
Party	Candidate	Votes	%
Republican	Melissa Garff Ballard	8,126	60.83%
Democratic	Phil Graves	4,468	33.45%
Libertarian	Daniel Rhead Cottam	764	5.72%
Total votes		13,358	100.00%

=== District 21 ===
2022 Utah House of Representatives 21st district election
Party	Candidate	Votes	%
Democratic	Sandra Hollins	6,320	75.32%
Republican	David C Atkin	2,071	24.68%
Total votes		8,391	100.00%

=== District 22 ===
2022 Utah House of Representatives 22nd district election
Party	Candidate	Votes	%
Democratic	Jen Dailey-Provost	13,467	100.00%
Total votes		13,467	100.00%

=== District 23 ===
2022 Utah House of Representatives 23rd district election
Party	Candidate	Votes	%
Democratic	Brian S. King	16,087	76.58%
Republican	Ruth Ann Abbott	4,386	20.88%
United Utah	Cabot Wm. Nelson	535	2.55%
Total votes		21,008	100.00%

=== District 24 ===
2022 Utah House of Representatives 24th district election
Party	Candidate	Votes	%
Democratic	Joel K. Briscoe	13,172	100.00%
Total votes		13,172	100.00%

=== District 25 ===
2022 Utah House of Representatives 25th district election
Party	Candidate	Votes	%
Democratic	Angela Romero	3,713	65.16%
Republican	Rebecca I Ipson	1,985	34.84%
Total votes		5,698	100.00%

=== District 26 ===
2022 Utah House of Representatives 26th district election
Party	Candidate	Votes	%
Republican	Quinn Kotter	4,748	50.68%
Democratic	Elizabeth Weight	4,621	49.32%
Total votes		9,369	100.00%

=== District 27 ===
2022 Utah House of Representatives 27th district election
Party	Candidate	Votes	%
Republican	Anthony E. Loubet	4,657	50.36%
Democratic	Clare Collard	4,590	49.64%
Total votes		9,247	100.00%

=== District 28 ===
2022 Utah House of Representatives 28th district election
Party	Candidate	Votes	%
Republican	Tim Jimenez	9,407	100.00%
Total votes		9,407	100.00%

=== District 29 ===
2022 Utah House of Representatives 29th district election
Party	Candidate	Votes	%
Republican	Bridger Bolinder	10,832	71.18%
Constitution	Kirk Pearson	2,254	14.81%
Democratic	Chris Dyer	2,131	14.00%
Total votes		13,358	100.00%

=== District 30 ===
2022 Utah House of Representatives 30th district election
Party	Candidate	Votes	%
Republican	Judy Weeks-Rohner	5,002	48.68%
Democratic	Fatima Dirie	4,636	45.11%
United Utah	Evan Rodgers	638	6.21%
Total votes		10,276	100.00%

=== District 31 ===
2022 Utah House of Representatives 31st district election
Party	Candidate	Votes	%
Democratic	Karen Kwan	5,528	61.87%
Republican	Andrew G. Nieto	3,407	38.13%
Total votes		8,935	100.00%

=== District 32 ===
2022 Utah House of Representatives 32nd district election
Party	Candidate	Votes	%
Democratic	Sahara Hayes	9,363	72.72%
Republican	Brittany Karzen	3,160	25.54%
United Utah	Adam Bean	353	2.74%
Total votes		12,876	100.00%

=== District 33 ===
2022 Utah House of Representatives 33rd district election
Party	Candidate	Votes	%
Democratic	Doug Owens	15,112	69.98%
Republican	Gerald Burt	6,482	30.02%
Total votes		21,594	100.00%

=== District 34 ===
2022 Utah House of Representatives 34th district election
Party	Candidate	Votes	%
Democratic	Carol Spackman Moss	11,473	67.12%
Republican	John D. McPhie	5,620	32.88%
Total votes		17,093	100.00%

=== District 35 ===
2022 Utah House of Representatives 35th district election
Party	Candidate	Votes	%
Democratic	Mark A Wheatley	7,233	54.26%
Republican	Belinda Johnson	6,098	45.74%
Total votes		13,331	100.00%

=== District 36 ===
2022 Utah House of Representatives 36th district election
Party	Candidate	Votes	%
Republican	Jim Dunnigan	7,810	54.44%
Democratic	Lynette Wendel	6,537	45.56%
Total votes		14,347	100.00%

=== District 37 ===
2022 Utah House of Representatives 37th district election
Party	Candidate	Votes	%
Democratic	Ashlee A. Matthews	4,644	56.79%
Republican	Henry Medina	3,534	43.21%
Total votes		8,178	100.00%

=== District 38 ===
2022 Utah House of Representatives 38th district election
Party	Candidate	Votes	%
Republican	Cheryl Acton	8,235	100.00%
Total votes		8,235	100.00%

=== District 39 ===
2022 Utah House of Representatives 39th district election
Party	Candidate	Votes	%
Republican	Ken Ivory	6,733	55.13%
Democratic	Hope Goeckeritz	5,479	44.87%
Total votes		12,212	100.00%

=== District 40 ===
2022 Utah House of Representatives 40th district election
Party	Candidate	Votes	%
Democratic	Andrew Stoddard	6,456	55.75%
Republican	Thomas E. Young	4,686	40.46%
United Utah	Tim Loftis	439	3.79%
Total votes		11,581	100.00%

=== District 41 ===
2022 Utah House of Representatives 41st district election
Party	Candidate	Votes	%
Democratic	Gay Lynn Bennion	12,579	63.17%
Republican	Wayne Gary Sandberg	7,333	36.83%
Total votes		19,912	100.00%

=== District 42 ===
2022 Utah House of Representatives 42nd district election
Party	Candidate	Votes	%
Republican	Robert Spendlove	11,529	57.83%
United Utah	David B. Jack	4,326	21.70%
Independent	Carson Barlow	4,081	20.47%
Total votes		19,936	100.00%

=== District 43 ===
2022 Utah House of Representatives 43rd district election
Party	Candidate	Votes	%
Republican	Steve Eliason	8,875	57.16%
Democratic	Alan C Anderson	6,652	42.84%
Total votes		15,527	100.00%

=== District 44 ===
2022 Utah House of Representatives 44th district election
Party	Candidate	Votes	%
Republican	Jordan Daniel Teuscher	10,745	64.85%
Democratic	Dee Grey	5,823	35.15%
Total votes		16,568	100.00%

=== District 45 ===
2022 Utah House of Representatives 45th district election
Party	Candidate	Votes	%
Republican	Susan Pulsipher	12,787	100.00%
Total votes		12,787	100.00%

=== District 46 ===
2022 Utah House of Representatives 46th district election
Party	Candidate	Votes	%
Republican	Jeff Stenquist	10,118	64.53%
United Utah	Ladd Johnson	5,562	35.47%
Total votes		15,680	100.00%

=== District 47 ===
2022 Utah House of Representatives 47th district election
Party	Candidate	Votes	%
Republican	Mark A. Strong	10,660	70.18%
United Utah	Dave Lundgren	4,530	29.82%
Total votes		15,190	100.00%

=== District 48 ===
2022 Utah House of Representatives 48th district election
Party	Candidate	Votes	%
Republican	Jay Cobb	8,309	59.99%
Democratic	Katie Olson	5,541	40.01%
Total votes		13,850	100.00%

=== District 49 ===
2022 Utah House of Representatives 49th district election
Party	Candidate	Votes	%
Republican	Candice B. Pierucci	9,310	69.65%
Democratic	Miles Pomeroy	4,057	30.35%
Total votes		13,367	100.00%

=== District 50 ===
2022 Utah House of Representatives 50th district election
Party	Candidate	Votes	%
Republican	Stephanie Gricius	10,214	100.00%
Total votes		10,214	100.00%

=== District 51 ===
2022 Utah House of Representatives 51st district election
Party	Candidate	Votes	%
Republican	Jefferson R. Moss	11,073	81.27%
Libertarian	Jeremy Baker	2,552	18.73%
Total votes		13,625	100.00%

=== District 52 ===
2022 Utah House of Representatives 52nd district election
Party	Candidate	Votes	%
Republican	Cory Maloy	10,820	100.00%
Total votes		10,820	100.00%

=== District 53 ===
2022 Utah House of Representatives 53rd district election
Party	Candidate	Votes	%
Republican	Kay J. Christofferson	11,048	75.53%
Democratic	Ann Schreck	2,913	19.91%
Libertarian	W. Andrew McCullough	667	4.56%
Total votes		14,628	100.00%

=== District 54 ===
2022 Utah House of Representatives 54th district election
Party	Candidate	Votes	%
Republican	Brady Brammer	14,402	80.14%
Democratic	Nikki Ray Pino	2,576	14.33%
United Utah	Andrew W. Matishen	993	5.53%
Total votes		17,971	100.00%

=== District 55 ===
2022 Utah House of Representatives 55th district election
Party	Candidate	Votes	%
Republican	Jon Hawkins	12,644	100.00%
Total votes		12,644	100.00%

=== District 56 ===
2022 Utah House of Representatives 56th district election
Party	Candidate	Votes	%
Republican	Val L. Peterson	8,866	100.00%
Total votes		8,866	100.00%

=== District 57 ===
2022 Utah House of Representatives 57th district election
Party	Candidate	Votes	%
Republican	Nelson Abbott	10,126	100.00%
Total votes		10,126	100.00%

=== District 58 ===
2022 Utah House of Representatives 58th district election
Party	Candidate	Votes	%
Republican	Keven J. Stratton	14,402	100.00%
Total votes		14,402	100.00%

=== District 59 ===
2022 Utah House of Representatives 59th district election
Party	Candidate	Votes	%
Republican	Mike Kohler	10,580	58.58%
Democratic	Meaghan Miller	7,481	41.42%
Total votes		18,061	100.00%

=== District 60 ===
2022 Utah House of Representatives 60th district election
Party	Candidate	Votes	%
Republican	Adam E. Robertson	3,786	100.00%
Total votes		3,786	100.00%

=== District 61 ===
2022 Utah House of Representatives 61st district election
Party	Candidate	Votes	%
Republican	Marsha Judkins	8,017	76.21%
Democratic	Michael Anderson	2,503	23.79%
Total votes		10,520	100.00%

=== District 62 ===
2022 Utah House of Representatives 62nd district election
Party	Candidate	Votes	%
Republican	Norm Thurston	5,920	60.94%
Democratic	Daniel Craig Friend	3,794	39.06%
Total votes		9,714	100.00%

=== District 63 ===
2022 Utah House of Representatives 63rd district election
Party	Candidate	Votes	%
Republican	Stephen L. Whyte	12,912	100.00%
Total votes		12,912	100.00%

=== District 64 ===
2022 Utah House of Representatives 64th district election
Party	Candidate	Votes	%
Republican	Jefferson S. Burton	11,044	80.00%
United Utah	Alan Wessman	2,761	23.79%
Total votes		13,805	100.00%

=== District 65 ===
2022 Utah House of Representatives 65th district election
Party	Candidate	Votes	%
Republican	Douglas R Welton	11,749	100.00%
Total votes		11,749	100.00%

=== District 66 ===
2022 Utah House of Representatives 66th district election
Party	Candidate	Votes	%
Republican	Steven J. Lund	12,437	84.12%
Constitution	Russ Hatch	2,347	15.88%
Total votes		14,784	100.00%

=== District 67 ===
2022 Utah House of Representatives 67th district election
Party	Candidate	Votes	%
Republican	Christine F. Watkins	11,995	100.00%
Total votes		11,995	100.00%

=== District 68 ===
2022 Utah House of Representatives 68th district election
Party	Candidate	Votes	%
Republican	Scott H. Chew	12,252	100.00%
Total votes		12,252	100.00%

=== District 69 ===
2022 Utah House of Representatives 69th district election
Party	Candidate	Votes	%
Republican	Phil Lyman	11,170	58.99%
Democratic	Davina Smith	7,766	41.01%
Total votes		18,936	100.00%

=== District 70 ===
2022 Utah House of Representatives 70th district election
Party	Candidate	Votes	%
Republican	Carl R. Albrecht	13,898	91.88%
United Utah	Zeno B Parry	1,228	8.12%
Total votes		15,126	100.00%

=== District 71 ===
2022 Utah House of Representatives 71st district election
Party	Candidate	Votes	%
Republican	Rex P Shipp	9,384	76.50%
Democratic	Dallas Joseph Guymon	1,996	16.27%
United Utah	Piper Manesse	886	7.22%
Total votes		12,266	100.00%

=== District 72 ===
2022 Utah House of Representatives 72nd district election
Party	Candidate	Votes	%
Republican	Joseph Elison	14,887	81.39%
Democratic	Ila M. Fica	3,404	18.61%
Total votes		18,291	100.00%

=== District 73 ===
2022 Utah House of Representatives 73rd district election
Party	Candidate	Votes	%
Republican	Colin W. Jack	13,596	100.00%
Total votes		13,596	100.00%

=== District 74 ===
2022 Utah House of Representatives 74th district election
Party	Candidate	Votes	%
Republican	R. Neil Walter	15,666	100.00%
Total votes		15,666	100.00%

=== District 75 ===
2022 Utah House of Representatives 75th district election
Party	Candidate	Votes	%
Republican	Walt Brooks	12,621	100.00%
Total votes		12,621	100.00%
