= Tiara Auxier =

American politician

Member of the Utah House of Representatives from the 4th district
- Incumbent
- Assumed office January 21, 2025
- Preceded by: Kera Birkeland

Personal details
- Party: Republican
- Education: University of Utah (BA)
- Website: www.tiara4utah.com

Tiara Auxier is an American politician serving as a Republican member of the Utah House of Representatives from the 4th district since January 2025. The district contains parts of Morgan County, Summit County, and all of Rich County.

== Early life, education, and career ==
Auxier grew up in Draper, Utah. She attended Salt Lake Community College and earned a Bachelor of Arts in accounting from the University of Utah, then worked as a tax accountant.

== Utah House of Representatives ==
After incumbent state representative Kera Birkeland resigned to spend time with her family, Auxier ran in the special election to replace her. She won the nomination convention on January 11, 2025.

=== Tenure ===
In a guest opinion article published in May 2025, she argued that students deserve at least 20 minutes of seated time to eat their meals.

== Electoral history ==
2025 Utah House District 4 special election results
Candidate	First round		Second round		Third round		Fourth round		Fifth round		Sixth round	
Candidate	Votes	%	Votes	%	Votes	%	Votes	%	Votes	%	Votes	%
Tiara Auxier	16	23.52%	13	19.11%	15	22.05%	18	26.47%	25	36.76%	36	52.94%
Ari Ioannides	11	16.17%	14	20.58%	15	22.05%	17	25%	19	27.94%	24	35.29%
Stafford Sievert	11	16.17%	12	17.64%	12	17.64%	11	16.17%	13	19.11%	8	11.76%
Heber Wayman	8	11.76%	14	20.58%	14	20.58%	14	20.58%	11	16.17%	Eliminated	
Melanie Monestere	11	16.17%	11	16.17%	12	17.64%	8	11.76%	Eliminated			
Ryan Trease	4	5.88%	2	2.94%	Eliminated							
Doug Durbano	4	5.88%	2	2.94%	Eliminated							
Kris Campbell	3	4.41%	Eliminated									
Total	68	100.0%	68	100.0%	68	100.0%	68	100.0%	68	100.0%	68	100.0%
