= 2018 Utah House of Representatives election =

- November 6, 2018

All 75 seats in the Utah House of Representatives 38 seats needed for a majority
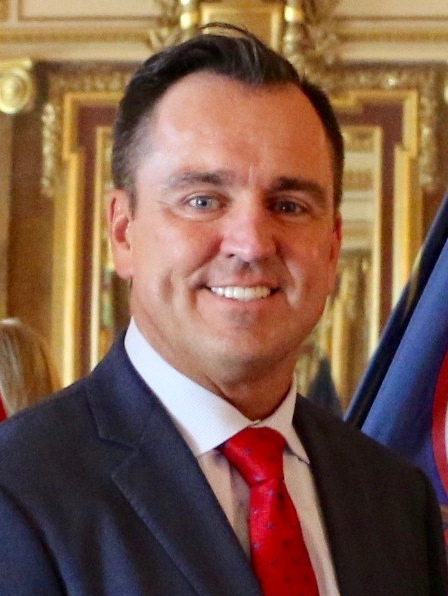

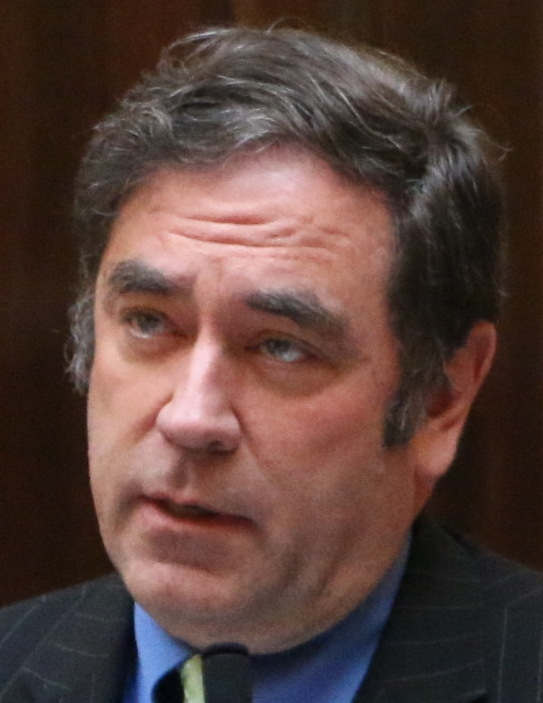
	Majority party	Minority party
Leader	Greg Hughes	Brian King
Party	Republican	Democratic
Leader since	January 26, 2015	January 26, 2015
Leader's seat	51–Draper	28–Salt Lake City
Last election	62 seats, 78.7%	13 seats, 21.3%
Seats before	62	13
Seats won	59	16
Seat change	▼3	▲3
Popular vote	624,450	344,736
Percentage	61.69%	34.06%
Swing	▼17.1 pp	▲12.8 pp
- Results: Democratic gain Republican hold Democratic hold
Speaker before election
Greg Hughes
Republican
Elected Speaker
Brad Wilson
Republican

The 2018 Utah House of Representatives election was held in the U.S. state of Utah on November 6, 2018, to elect members to the House of Representatives of the 63rd Utah State Legislature. A primary election was held in several districts on June 26, 2018. The election coincided with the election for U.S. Senate and other elections.

The Utah Republican Party won a majority of seats, keeping the Republican majority that they had held since 1977. The new legislature convened on January 28, 2019.

== Background ==
Republicans had held the Utah State House of Representative since 1977, and the chamber was not considered competitive in 2018. However, as was the case in many states, Democrats were encouraged to see the purported "Blue Wave" come to the Utah State House.

== Electoral system ==
The 75 members of the House of Representatives were elected from single-member districts by first-past-the-post voting to two-year terms. Contested nominations of the Democratic and Republican parties for each district were determined by an open primary election. Minor-party and independent candidates were nominated by petition. Write-in candidates had to file a request with the secretary of state's office for votes for them to be counted.

== Predictions ==
Source	Ranking	As of
Governing	Safe R	October 8, 2018

== Results ==
Of the 75 seats, Republican candidates won 59 and Democratic candidates won 16.

=== District 1 ===
2018 Utah House of Representatives 1st district election
Party	Candidate	Votes	%
Republican	Joel Ferry	8,845	73.7%
Democratic	Joshua Hardy	2,040	17.0%
Constitution	Sherry Phipps	1,113	9.3%
Total votes		11,998	100.00%

=== District 2 ===
2018 Utah House of Representatives 2nd district election
Party	Candidate	Votes	%
Republican	Jefferson Moss	11,952	80.6%
Democratic	Tyler Allred	2,881	19.4%
Total votes		14,833	100.00%

=== District 3 ===
2018 Utah House of Representatives 3rd district election
Party	Candidate	Votes	%
Republican	Val Potter	10,617	76.4%
Democratic	Marilyn Mecham	3,273	23.6%
Total votes		13,890	100.00%

=== District 4 ===
2018 Utah House of Representatives 4th district election
Party	Candidate	Votes	%
Republican	Dan Johnson	6,086	60.8%
Democratic	Josh Brundage	3,916	39.2%
Total votes		10,002	100.00%

=== District 5 ===
2018 Utah House of Representatives 5th district election
Party	Candidate	Votes	%
Republican	Casey Snider	10,597	75.7%
Democratic	Karina Andelin Brown	3,406	24.3%
Total votes		14,003	100.00%

=== District 6 ===
2018 Utah House of Representatives 6th district election
Party	Candidate	Votes	%
Republican	Cory Maloy	12,338	100.0%
Total votes		12,338	100.00%

=== District 7 ===
2018 Utah House of Representatives 7th district election
Party	Candidate	Votes	%
Republican	Kyle Andersen	9,301	66.0%
Democratic	David Owen	4,793	34.0%
Total votes		14,094	100.00%

=== District 8 ===
2018 Utah House of Representatives 8th district election
Party	Candidate	Votes	%
Republican	Steve Waldrip	6,795	50.8%
Democratic	Deana Froerer	6,581	49.2%
Total votes		13,376	100.00%

=== District 9 ===
2018 Utah House of Representatives 9th district election
Party	Candidate	Votes	%
Republican	Calvin Musselman	5,130	53.0%
Democratic	Kathie Darby	4,555	47.0%
Total votes		9,685	100.00%

=== District 10 ===
2018 Utah House of Representatives 10th district election
Party	Candidate	Votes	%
Democratic	LaWanna Shurtliff	5,516	52.2%
Republican	Lorraine Brown	4,719	44.7%
	Other/Write-In	325	3.1%
Total votes		10,560	100.00%

=== District 11 ===
2018 Utah House of Representatives 11th district election
Party	Candidate	Votes	%
Republican	Kelly Miles	7,535	54.5%
Democratic	Jason Allen	6,283	45.5%
Total votes		13,818	100.00%

=== District 12 ===
2018 Utah House of Representatives 12th district election
Party	Candidate	Votes	%
Republican	Mike Schultz	8,790	70.0%
Democratic	Rick Jones	3,759	30.0%
Total votes		12,549	100.00%

=== District 13 ===
2018 Utah House of Representatives 13th district election
Party	Candidate	Votes	%
Republican	Paul Ray	7,909	64.2%
Democratic	Tab Uno	4,416	35.8%
Total votes		12,325	100.00%

=== District 14 ===
2018 Utah House of Representatives 14th district election
Party	Candidate	Votes	%
Republican	Karianne Lisonbee	6,868	63.1%
Democratic	Shanell Day	4,010	36.9%
Total votes		10,878	100.00%

=== District 15 ===
2018 Utah House of Representatives 15th district election
Party	Candidate	Votes	%
Republican	Brad R. Wilson	12,289	76.9%
Democratic	Rich Miller	3,701	23.1%
Total votes		15,990	100.00%

=== District 16 ===
2018 Utah House of Representatives 16th district election
Party	Candidate	Votes	%
Republican	Stephen Handy	7,948	62.5%
Democratic	Cheryl Nunn	3,708	29.1%
Libertarian	Brent Zimmerman	1,065	8.4%
Total votes		12,721	100.00%

=== District 17 ===
2018 Utah House of Representatives 17th district election
Party	Candidate	Votes	%
Republican	Stewart Barlow	11,252	73.2%
Democratic	Dawn Nunn	4,117	26.8%
Total votes		15,369	100.00%

=== District 18 ===
2018 Utah House of Representatives 18th district election
Party	Candidate	Votes	%
Republican	Timothy Hawkes	12,666	70.7%
Democratic	Adam Alba	5,237	29.3%
Total votes		17,903	100.00%

=== District 19 ===
2018 Utah House of Representatives 19th district election
Party	Candidate	Votes	%
Republican	Raymond Ward	10,998	65.4%
Democratic	Courtney Jones	4,712	28.0%
Libertarian	Joseph Speciale	1,101	6.5%
Total votes		16,811	100.00%

=== District 20 ===
2018 Utah House of Representatives 20th district election
Party	Candidate	Votes	%
Republican	Melissa Garff Ballard	10,111	65.3%
Democratic	Ryan Jones	5,379	34.7%
Total votes		15,490	100.00%

=== District 21 ===
2018 Utah House of Representatives 21st district election
Party	Candidate	Votes	%
Republican	Douglas Sagers	7,809	64%
Democratic	Debbie Vigil	4,397	36%
Total votes		12,206	100.00%

=== District 22 ===
2018 Utah House of Representatives 22nd district election
Party	Candidate	Votes	%
Democratic	Sue Duckworth	5,485	53.1%
Republican	Barbara Stallone	3,712	35.9%
Libertarian	Amber Christiansen Beltran	749	7.2%
Constitution	Marilee Roose	393	3.8%
Total votes		10,339	100.00%

=== District 23 ===
2018 Utah House of Representatives 23rd district election
Party	Candidate	Votes	%
Democratic	Sandra Hollins	6,058	75.3%
Republican	Arnold Jones	1,982	24.7%
Total votes		8,040	100.00%

=== District 24 ===
2018 Utah House of Representatives 24th district election
Party	Candidate	Votes	%
Democratic	Jen Dailey-Provost	14,125	77.3%
Republican	Scott Rosenbush	4,150	22.7%
Total votes		18,275	100.00%

=== District 25 ===
2018 Utah House of Representatives 25th district election
Party	Candidate	Votes	%
Democratic	Joel Briscoe	14,976	91.1%
United Utah	Cabot Nelson	1,458	8.9%
Total votes		16,434	100.00%

=== District 26 ===
2018 Utah House of Representatives 26th district election
Party	Candidate	Votes	%
Democratic	Angela Romero	7,098	75.6%
Republican	Man Hung	1,795	19.1%
Libertarian	Jonathan Greene	502	5.3%
Total votes		9,395	100.00%

=== District 27 ===
2018 Utah House of Representatives 27th district election
Party	Candidate	Votes	%
Republican	Brady Brammer	12,050	75.6%
Democratic	Elisabeth Luntz	3,050	19.1%
Libertarian	Joseph Geddes Buchman	497	3.1%
Independent American	Curt Crosby	344	2.2%
Total votes		15,941	100.00%

=== District 28 ===
2018 Utah House of Representatives 28th district election
Party	Candidate	Votes	%
Democratic	Brian King	16,494	100.00%
Total votes			100.00%

=== District 29 ===
2018 Utah House of Representatives 29th district election
Party	Candidate	Votes	%
Republican	Lee B. Perry	11,992	79.6%
Democratic	Kerry Wayne	3,075	20.4%
Total votes		15,067	100.00%

=== District 30 ===
2018 Utah House of Representatives 30th district election
Party	Candidate	Votes	%
Republican	Mike Winder	5,860	56.6%
Democratic	Robert Burch Jr.	4,492	43.4%
Total votes		10,352	100.00%

=== District 31 ===
2018 Utah House of Representatives 31st district election
Party	Candidate	Votes	%
Democratic	Elizabeth Weight	4,976	61.6%
Republican	Fred Johnson	2,856	35.4%
United Utah	Brian Fabbi	244	3.0%
Total votes		8,076	100.00%

=== District 32 ===
2018 Utah House of Representatives 32nd district election
Party	Candidate	Votes	%
Democratic	Suzanne Harrison	9,465	56.26%
Republican	Brad Bonham	7,091	42.15%
United Utah	Bjorn Jones	268	1.59%
Total votes		16,824	100.00%

=== District 33 ===
2018 Utah House of Representatives 33rd district election
Party	Candidate	Votes	%
Republican	Craig Hall	4,250	52.9%
Democratic	Ira Hatch	3,786	47.1%
Total votes		8,036	100.00%

=== District 34 ===
2018 Utah House of Representatives 34th district election
Party	Candidate	Votes	%
Democratic	Karen Kwan	7,042	60.0%
Republican	David Young	4,072	40.0%
Total votes		11,744	100.00%

=== District 35 ===
2018 Utah House of Representatives 35th district election
Party	Candidate	Votes	%
Democratic	Mark Wheatley	6,797	63.5%
Republican	Robert Edgel	2,935	27.4%
Libertarian	Robert Edgel	967	9.04%
Total votes		11,744	100.00%

=== District 36 ===
2018 Utah House of Representatives 36th district election
Party	Candidate	Votes	%
Democratic	Patrice Arent	13,417	62.9%
Republican	Todd Zenger	7,903	37.1%
Total votes		21,320	100.00%

=== District 37 ===
2018 Utah House of Representatives 37th district election
Party	Candidate	Votes	%
Democratic	Carol Spackman Moss	11,467	62.8%
Republican	David N. Sundwell	6,786	37.2%
Total votes		18,253	100.00%

=== District 38 ===
2018 Utah House of Representatives 38th district election
Party	Candidate	Votes	%
Republican	Eric Hutchings	4,364	50.7%
Democratic	David N. Sundwell	4,246	49.3%
Total votes		8,610	100.00%

=== District 39 ===
2018 Utah House of Representatives 39th district election
Party	Candidate	Votes	%
Republican	Jim Dunnigan	6,839	56.3%
Democratic	Stephen Peck	5,301	43.7%
Total votes		12,140	100.00%

=== District 40 ===
2018 Utah House of Representatives 40th district election
Party	Candidate	Votes	%
Democratic	Stephanie Pitcher	11,189	69.2%
Republican	Peter L. Kraus	4,280	26.5%
Independent American	David Else	711	4.4%
Total votes		16,180	100.00%

=== District 41 ===
2018 Utah House of Representatives 31st district election
Party	Candidate	Votes	%
Republican	Mark A. Strong	11,756	65.7%
Democratic	Wendy Garvin	4,535	25.3%
United Utah	Steve Watson	1,607	9.0%
Total votes		17,898	100.00%

=== District 42 ===
2018 Utah House of Representatives 31st district election
Party	Candidate	Votes	%
Republican	Kim Coleman	9,723	66.9%
United Utah	Amy L Martz	4,803	33.1%
Total votes		14,526	100.00%

=== District 43 ===
2018 Utah House of Representatives 31st district election
Party	Candidate	Votes	%
Republican	Cheryl K. Action	5,687	48.1%
Democratic	Diane Lewis	5,290	44.7%
Libertarian	Shawn Curtis	853	7.2%
Total votes		11,830	100.00%

=== District 44 ===
2018 Utah House of Representatives 31st district election
Party	Candidate	Votes	%
Democratic	Andrew Stoddard	8,284	55.0%
Republican	Bruce R. Cutler	6,768	45.0%
Total votes		15,042	100.00%

=== District 45 ===
2018 Utah House of Representatives 31st district election
Party	Candidate	Votes	%
Republican	Steve Eliason	10,276	100.0%
Total votes		10,276	100.00%

=== District 46 ===
2018 Utah House of Representatives 31st district election
Party	Candidate	Votes	%
Democratic	Marie H. Poulson	11,466	61.5%
Republican	Greg Johnson	6,246	33.5%
Libertarian	Lee Anne Walker	930	5.0%
Total votes		18,642	100.00%

=== District 47 ===
2018 Utah House of Representatives 31st district election
Party	Candidate	Votes	%
Republican	Ken Ivory	6,673	53.6%
Democratic	Scott Bell	5,774	46.4%
Total votes		12,447	100.00%

=== District 48 ===
2018 Utah House of Representatives 40th district election
Party	Candidate	Votes	%
Republican	Keven J. Stratton	10,736	86.9%
Independent American	Aaron Heineman	1,612	13.1%
Total votes		12,348	100.00%

=== District 49 ===
2018 Utah House of Representatives 31st district election
Party	Candidate	Votes	%
Republican	Robert Spendlove	9,107	48.5%
Democratic	Anthony Sudweeks	8,554	45.6%
United Utah	Mark Russell	1,112	5.9%
Total votes		18,773	100.00%

=== District 50 ===
2018 Utah House of Representatives 31st district election
Party	Candidate	Votes	%
Republican	Susan Pulsipher	14,312	69.6%
Democratic	Megan Wiesen	6,264	30.4%
Total votes		20,576	100.00%

=== District 51 ===
2018 Utah House of Representatives 31st district election
Party	Candidate	Votes	%
Republican	Jeff Stenquist	8,706	61.0%
United Utah	Michele Weeks	5,577	39.0%
Total votes		14,283	100.00%

=== District 52 ===
2018 Utah House of Representatives 31st district election
Party	Candidate	Votes	%
Republican	John Knotwell	12,640	66.5%
Democratic	Dan McClellan	6,370	33.5%
Total votes		19,010	100.00%

=== District 53 ===
2018 Utah House of Representatives 31st district election
Party	Candidate	Votes	%
Republican	Logan Wilde	11,993	64.9%
Democratic	Christopher Neville	6,474	35.1%
Total votes		18,467	100.00%

=== District 54 ===
2018 Utah House of Representatives 31st district election
Party	Candidate	Votes	%
Republican	Tim Quinn	9,836	50.4%
Democratic	Meaghan Miller	9,674	49.6%
Total votes		19,510	100.00%

=== District 55 ===
2018 Utah House of Representatives 31st district election
Party	Candidate	Votes	%
Republican	Scott H. Chew	10,466	89.4%
Democratic	Christina Higgins	1,247	10.6%
Total votes		11,713	100.00%

=== District 56 ===
2018 Utah House of Representatives 31st district election
Party	Candidate	Votes	%
Republican	Kay J. Christofferson	11,815	100.00%
Total votes		11,815	100.00%

=== District 57 ===
2018 Utah House of Representatives 31st district election
Party	Candidate	Votes	%
Republican	Jon Hawkins	9,256	76.2%
United Utah	Hillary Stirling	2,898	23.8%
Total votes		12,154	100.00%

=== District 58 ===
2018 Utah House of Representatives 1st district election
Party	Candidate	Votes	%
Republican	Derrin R. Owens	9,011	78.6%
Democratic	Lynn Zaritsky	1,469	12.8%
Constitution	Russell G. Hatch	990	8.6%
Total votes		11,470	100.00%

=== District 59 ===
2018 Utah House of Representatives 40th district election
Party	Candidate	Votes	%
Republican	Val L. Peterson	9,812	82.9%
Independent American	Gregory Himura	2,026	17.1%
Total votes		11,838	100.00%

=== District 60 ===
2018 Utah House of Representatives 1st district election
Party	Candidate	Votes	%
Republican	Brad Daw	8,445	71.9%
Democratic	Alan F. Keele	3,302	28.1%
Total votes		11,747	100.00%

=== District 61 ===
2018 Utah House of Representatives 31st district election
Party	Candidate	Votes	%
Republican	Marsha Judkins	7,407	76.6%
United Utah	Eric Chase	1,405	14.5%
Utah Green Party	Matt Styles	859	8.9%
Total votes		9,671	100.00%

=== District 62 ===
2018 Utah House of Representatives 31st district election
Party	Candidate	Votes	%
Republican	Travis M. Seegmiller	13,912	100.00%
Total votes		13,912	100.00%

=== District 63 ===
2018 Utah House of Representatives 31st district election
Party	Candidate	Votes	%
Republican	Adam Robertson	3,840	100.00%
Total votes		3,840	100.00%

=== District 64 ===
2018 Utah House of Representatives 31st district election
Party	Candidate	Votes	%
Republican	Norm Thurston	4,849	55.5%
Democratic	Daniel Craig Friend	2,662	30.5%
United Utah	Hal Miller	1,219	14.0%
Total votes		8,730	100.00%

=== District 65 ===
2018 Utah House of Representatives 31st district election
Party	Candidate	Votes	%
Republican	Francis D. Gibson	10,650	76.4%
Democratic	Sue A. Womack	3,289	23.6%
Total votes		13,939	100.00%

=== District 66 ===
2018 Utah House of Representatives 31st district election
Party	Candidate	Votes	%
Republican	Mike McKell	10,593	83.4%
Democratic	Paul Jones Dayton	2,109	16.6%
Total votes		12,702	100.00%

=== District 67 ===
2018 Utah House of Representatives 31st district election
Party	Candidate	Votes	%
Republican	Marc Roberts	11,217	100.00%
Total votes		11,217	100.00%

=== District 68 ===
2018 Utah House of Representatives 1st district election
Party	Candidate	Votes	%
Republican	Merrill Nelson	10,509	71.4%
Democratic	Merle Travis Wall	2,367	16.1%
Constitution	Kirk D Pearson	960	6.5%
Libertarian	Denyse Housley Cox	596	4.0%
Independent American	Warren Rogers	292	2.0%
Total votes		14,724	100.00%

=== District 69 ===
2018 Utah House of Representatives 31st district election
Party	Candidate	Votes	%
Republican	Christine F. Watkins	8,589	72.1%
Democratic	Tim Glenn	3,320	27.9%
Total votes		11,909	100.00%

=== District 70 ===
2018 Utah House of Representatives 31st district election
Party	Candidate	Votes	%
Republican	Carl R. Albrecht	10,634	79.4%
Democratic	Robert Greenberg	2,753	20.6%
Total votes		13,387	100.00%

=== District 71 ===
2018 Utah House of Representatives 31st district election
Party	Candidate	Votes	%
Republican	Brad Last	12,468	78.6%
Democratic	Chuck Goode	3,388	21.4%
Total votes		15,856	100.00%

=== District 72 ===
2018 Utah House of Representatives 1st district election
Party	Candidate	Votes	%
Republican	Rex P Shipp	8,887	74.7%
Democratic	Zeno B. Parry	2,002	16.8%
Libertarian	Barry Even Short	1,001	8.4%
Total votes		11,890	100.00%

=== District 73 ===
2018 Utah House of Representatives 31st district election
Party	Candidate	Votes	%
Republican	Phil Lyman	9,388	67.5%
Democratic	Marsha M Holland	4,528	32.5%
Total votes		13,916	100.00%

=== District 74 ===
2018 Utah House of Representatives 1st district election
Party	Candidate	Votes	%
Republican	V. Lowry Snow	13,108	76.3%
Libertarian	Daniel Holloway	4,082	23.7%
Total votes		17,190	100.00%

=== District 75 ===
2018 Utah House of Representatives 1st district election
Party	Candidate	Votes	%
Republican	Walt Brooks	9,575	78.0%
Independent American	Keith R. Kelsch	1,353	11.0%
Libertarian	Michael A Gardner	1,341	10.9%
Total votes		12,269	100.00%
