= Henry H. "Hank" Price =

American politician

Hank Price
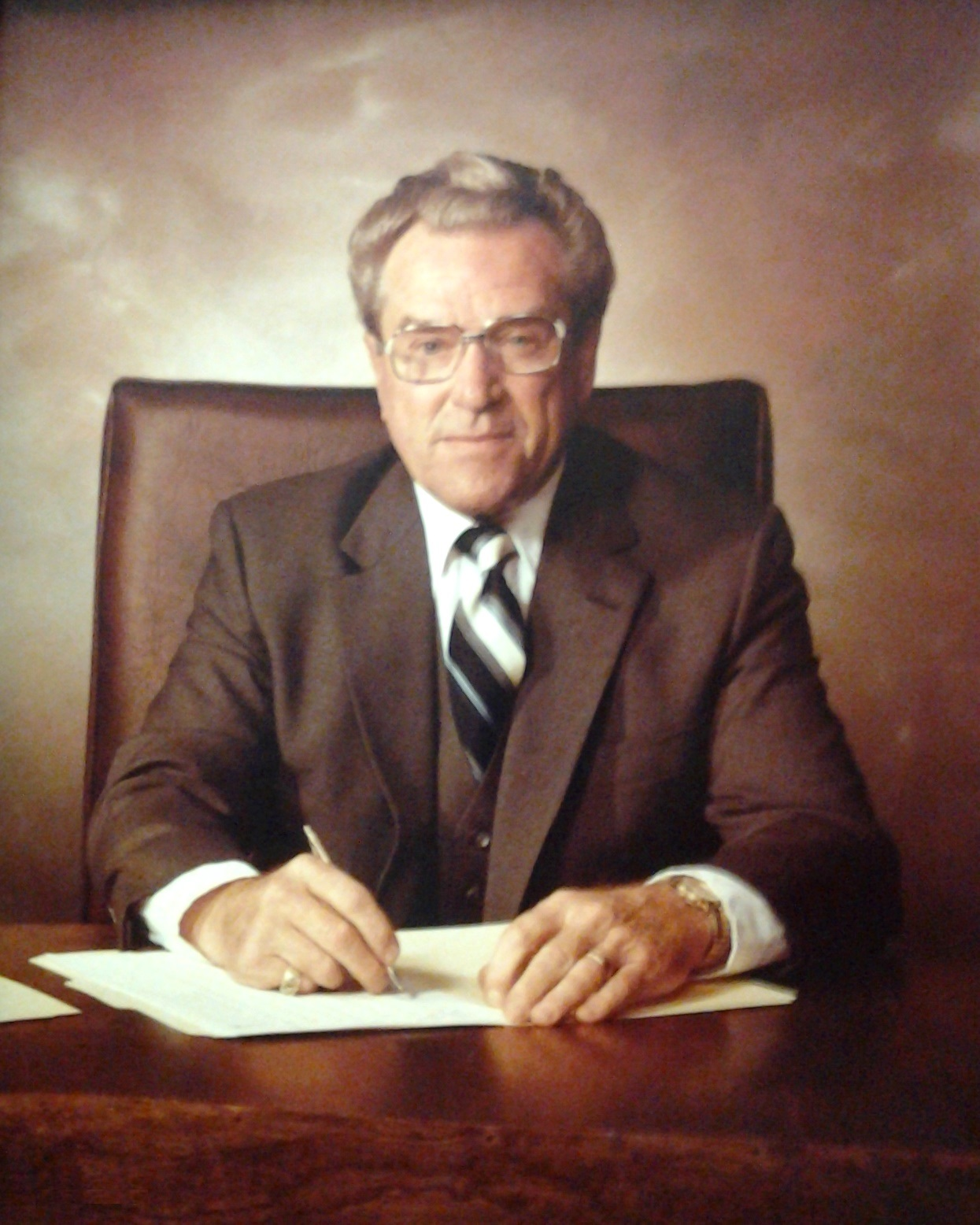

Mayor of West Valley City
- In office July 1, 1980 – January 4, 1982
- Preceded by: Office established
- Succeeded by: Gerald K. Maloney

Personal details
- Born: December 10, 1915 Layton, Utah, US
- Died: March 1, 2002 (aged 86) West Valley City, Utah, US
- Spouse(s): Mary Parr, Hazel Ringwald Merle
- Children: 1
- Profession: Army commander, Justice of the Peace

Henry H. "Hank" Price was an American politician who served as the first mayor of West Valley City, Utah, and was the driving force behind the city's incorporation.

== Early life and career ==
Henry Herbert Price was born December 10, 1915, in Layton, Utah, to Herbert Boyle and Irma Leon Tall Price. He was a "self-described Army brat from Chicago," moving around in his youth and on his own after age 14. He married Mary Parr in Granger, Utah on August 5, 1937. Early in their marriage World War II broke out; Price was at Pearl Harbor with the Army when the Japanese attacked December 7, 1941. He was sent to serve in the European Theater, where he fought in the Battle of the Bulge and received a Purple Heart for an injury sustained during a run-in with a tank.

After the war, Price served as a deputy post commander at Fort Douglas in Salt Lake City, retiring in 1973. After traveling a while, he returned to his beloved Granger, where he was elected Justice of the Peace in 1974. Price was active in community affairs in the unincorporated part of Salt Lake County known as Granger-Hunter. He served as chair of the Granger-Hunter Community Council, president of the Granger Lions Club, and was an active member of the Eagles, Elks and Moose clubs as well as the Veterans of Foreign Wars and other professional organizations.

== West Valley City Incorporation ==
The first incorporation vote for the Granger-Hunter area was held Feb. 7, 1978. While many were involved with the push to become a city, "it was abundantly clear that the driving force behind incorporation was Henry Price, the Justice of the Peace in Granger," said newspaper reporter Mike Gorrell. "Price was the true leader. People turned to him for answers, and he had them. Accentuating points with frequent waves of his trademark--an unlit cigar--Price left no doubt he knew what he wanted and intended to get it." The 1978 incorporation vote failed 6,053 to 4,944, but voters had elected Hank Price as mayor to govern the city in the event incorporation passed.

On February 26, 1980, a second incorporation effort was barely successful at the ballot box (5,179 to 5,099), and the Granger, Hunter, and Redwood areas became incorporated as "West Valley City." Price was elected the city's first mayor in a landslide over Hiland Kent, a retired Hunter businessman and chair of the Granger-Hunter Improvement District Board (5,309 votes, 68%, to 2,537, 32%).

== Launching a new city ==
Due to the close incorporation vote a recount was requested, which announced on March 7, 1980, that the new city was created by a margin of only 72 votes—5,185 for incorporation, 5,113 against. Price was satisfied and announced "Now we're going to proceed immediately to implement West Valley City."

Price held the first formal public meeting of the city on March 17 in the Granger Library, and on April 14 he filed paperwork with the Utah Secretary of State's office positioning West Valley City to come into existence on July 1, 1980, at 9:00 am. On April 29 he unveiled a tentative $4.7 million budget for the new city's first year — with property tax for the average homeowner at $64 per year, $27 less than what the county would have charged had West Valley City not incorporated. "In due time," Price predicted, "we'll make a beautiful place out of what is now called West Valley City."

However, a disincorporation effort led by K.T. Magnusson threatened the existence of Price's new city. "We Blew It - Now Let's Undo It" said the anti-city literature, and the courts set the disincorporation effort for July 8, only a week after the new city was supposed to launch. Many thought it prudent for the city to postpone its July 1 start date until the outcome of the disincorporation vote was known. Price vowed to launch West Valley City on July 1 regardless. "Damn the torpedoes," he famously grumbled.

Price was sworn in as the mayor of Utah's newest city on July 1, 1980, by Judge David K. Winder. His inaugural remarks focused on the looming disincorporation vote. "Don't give the City up. Don't give it to the (County) bureaucrats," he pled. "Give us an opportunity to fail or succeed." Because Zions Bank refused to issue a letter of credit to the new city until the disincorporation vote was resolved, Mayor Price and City Commissioners Jerry Wagstaff and Renee Mackay bought gas for the police cars that first week. "When the tanks run dry," Price said of the 15 police cruisers, "it will be my turn. And after they run dry again, Mrs. Mackay will take her turn."

On July 8 the disincorporation vote failed, with 6,542 for disincorporation and 9,239 against dissolving the new city. Price pulled out his trademark victory cigar and waved it as he talked. "If we wouldn't have gone ahead on July 1," said Price, "we would have lost. We showed the guts and determination to make it work. And it paid off."

== Defeat for reelection ==
West Valley City's form of government at incorporation was composed of three commissioners: Mayor Hank Price, Renee Mackay, and Jerald Wagstaff, who often disagreed as the new city began. Price opposed the two commissioners on the budget for the city's second year, and the two commissioners voted to fire Price's senior aide Randy Baker at the end of their May 28, 1981, commission meeting. This led to Price storming out of the room, furious, and telling Mackay on his way out, "Madame, put your head in the toilet and flush it!"

A form of government change for the fledgling city was clearly needed and was recommended by a city task force. Despite Price's advocacy for a mayor-council form of government, city residents voted to change the form of government to a council-manager form on July 28, 1981. All three commissioners entered the race for mayor, along with businessman Gerald K. Maloney.

The primary election of October 6, 1981, stunned the city's commissioners, as outsider Maloney led them all with 1,769 votes (30%), followed by Wagstaff with 1,689 (29%). Incumbent Mayor Hank Price (1,448 votes, 29%) and Mackay (972 votes, 17%) were eliminated. After the primary, Price mounted a write-in campaign to retain his seat, and Mackay endorsed her fellow city commissioner Wagstaff. "You need dedication to create customs and traditions," Price said of the new city and his write-in campaign. "I never started anything that I didn't go in to win. I demonstrated that in getting West Valley City started."

On General Election Day, November 3, 1981, one-third of the city's eligible voters came out to elect Maloney as the city's second mayor. With a large turnout in his home area of Hunter, Maloney captured 42.7% (3,913 votes), Wagstaff polled 36.4% (3,329 votes), and Price posted an impressive showing for a write-in with 20.9% (1,912 votes). On January 4, 1982, the outgoing mayor spoke briefly at Maloney's swearing-in and handed him the Key to the City.

== Retirement and legacy ==
Upon retiring from his Justice of the Peace duties, Price moved to St. George. His wife Mary died on June 25, 1989. At the age of 75, in 1991, Price married widow Hazel Merle. Hank Price died on March 1, 2002, at the home of his daughter in West Valley City and is buried in Valley View Memorial Park, West Valley City, Utah. His second wife, Hazel, died eight years later on March 4, 2010. Price and his first wife Mary had one daughter, Trudy, who married Kent Bawden and brought them four granddaughters (Sandra, Patricia, Julie and Mary). Price had 13 great-grandchildren at the time of his death.

"I would like to leave to posterity," Price said when running to be the city's first mayor and pushing the incorporation of West Valley City, "a real beautiful, small city. It's going to be the best city humanly possible to create." His "small city" ended up being Utah's second largest municipality.

On what would have been Price's 98th birthday, Mayor Mike Winder declared December 10 as "Hank Price Day" in West Valley City with a formal proclamation honoring "the George Washington of West Valley City" and presentations to his family during the city council meeting.

== Notes ==
Preceded by None	Mayors of West Valley City; 1980 – 1982	Succeeded by Gerald K. Maloney
