= Gearlds =

Gearlds is both a given name and a surname. Notable people with the name include:

- Gearld Wright (1933–2002), American politician
- Katie Gearlds (born 1984), American basketball player
