= Verona Mauga =

American politician

Member of the Utah House of Representatives from the 31st district
- Incumbent
- Assumed office January 1, 2025
- Preceded by: Brett Garner

Personal details
- Born: Kahuku, Hawaii, U.S.
- Party: Democratic
- Website: Legislature website Campaign website

Verona Sagato-Mauga is an American entrepreneur and politician serving as a member of the Utah House of Representatives from the 31st district since 2025. A Democrat, she is one of the first Samoans elected to the Utah State Legislature alongside Jake Fitisemanu and the first Samoan woman to serve in any continental state legislature.

== Early life and education ==
Mauga was born in Kahuku, Hawaii, to parents who immigrated from Samoa. She moved to West Valley City, Utah, as a child and graduated from Alta High School.

== Career ==
She is a co-owner of My Choice Utah, an organization providing homes for individuals with intellectual and developmental disabilities, as well as Sagato Bakery & Café in Midvale, and co-founded Le Malu, an organization focused on American Pacific Islander mentorship and cultural preservation initiatives.

=== Utah House of Representatives ===
Mauga ran for the Utah House of Representatives in 2024 against incumbent Democrat Brett Garner, who was appointed to the seat after Karen Kwan won a special election for the Utah State Senate. She was among a growing number of Asian American and Pacific Islanders running for office in Utah. The Salt Lake County Democratic Party voted to nominate Mauga for the general election over Garner by 30 to 11 votes respectively.

== Electoral history ==
=== 2024 ===
Utah's 31st House District General Election, 2024
Party	Candidate	Votes	%
Democratic	Verona Mauga	7,148	57.90%
Republican	Bill Swann	5,198	42.10%
Total votes		12,346	100%
