= Jake Fitisemanu =

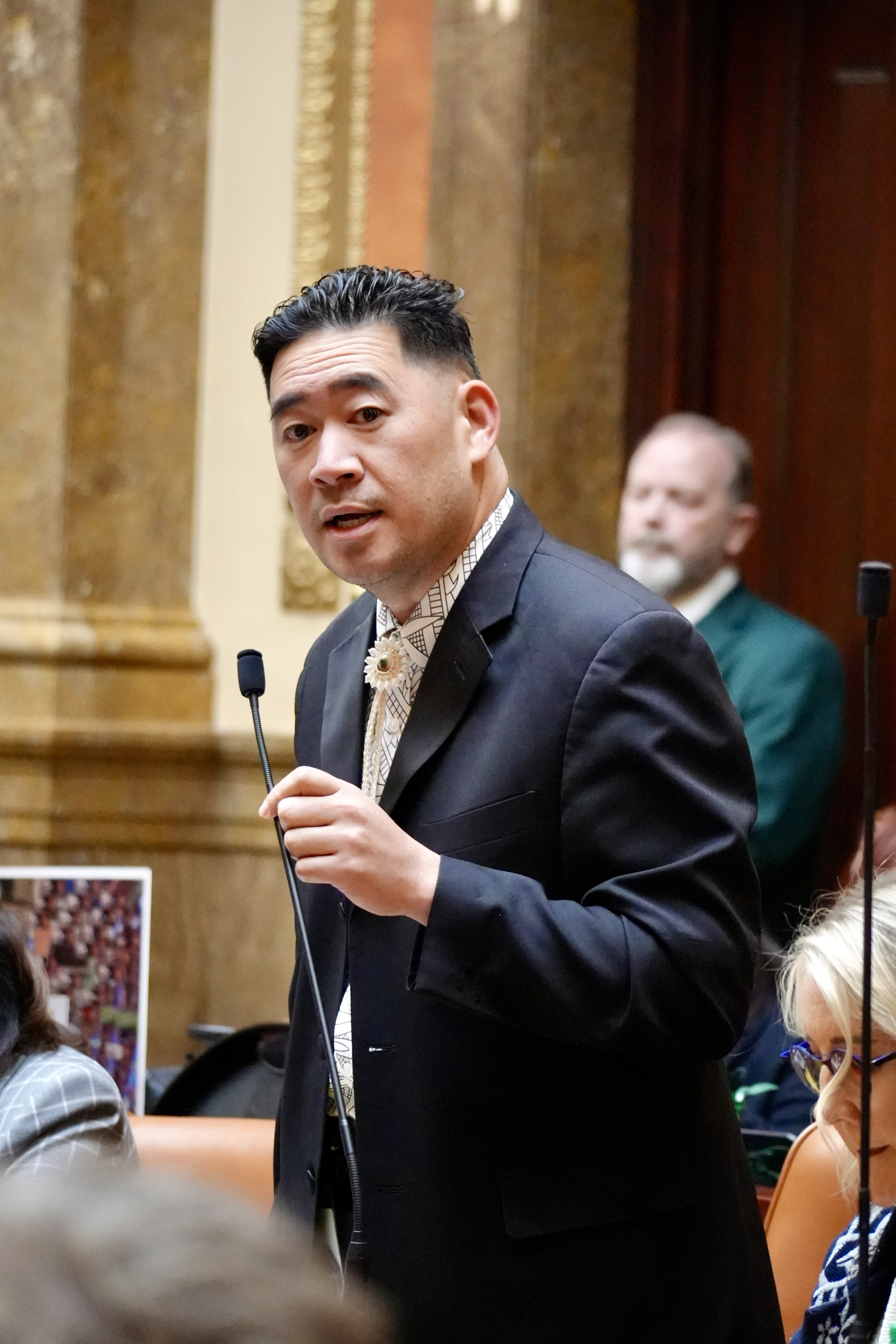
- Fitisemanu speaking on the floor of the Utah House of Representatives

Member of the Utah House of Representatives from the 30th district
- Incumbent
- Assumed office January 1, 2025
- Preceded by: Judy Weeks-Rohner

Personal details
- Born: Wellington, New Zealand
- Party: Democratic
- Education: Westminster University (BS, MPH)
- Website: Legislature website Campaign website

Laufou Jacob James Malietoa Talavou Siu Lung Fitisemanu Jr. is an American public health professional and community advocate serving as a member of the Utah House of Representatives from the 30th district since 2025. He and Verona Mauga are the first Samoans elected to the Utah State Legislature.

== Early life and education ==
Fitisemanu was born in Wellington, New Zealand and raised in Hawaii and Utah. He is the oldest of eight children, raised by an American mother with Korean and Chinese ancestry, Karen Jun Lin Dang, and a Samoan father, Sauaga Jacob Fitisemanu. He earned a Bachelor of Science in social studies and a Masters of Public Health from Westminster University.

== Career ==
=== Public health and early political career ===
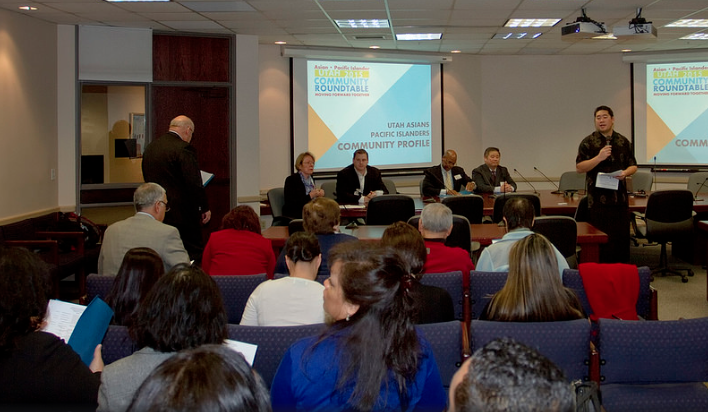
Fitisemanu speaks at a White House's initiative on Asian Americans and Pacific Islanders event in 2015.

Fitisemanu has over 15 years of professional experience working in public health and clinical administration in both the state government and private hospital system sectors. He has taught as an associate instructor at the University of Utah and Salt Lake Community College and has authored multiple peer-reviewed publications, including a textbook chapter. He co-founded the Utah Pacific Islander Health Coalition in 2011, where he worked to combat high rates of obesity and diabetes in the local Pacific Islander community.

President Barack Obama appointed him to the President's Advisory Commission on Asian Americans & Pacific Islanders, where he served until his resignation in 2017. He also served two appointed terms on the U.S. Census Bureau's National Advisory Committee and has served on the board of directors for the Asian and Pacific Islander American Health Forum, Mana Academy Charter School. He currently sits on the University of Utah's Dentistry Advancement Board, the Board of Directors of The Children's Center, and the advisory committee of the National Academy of Medicine - Culture of Health program.

He was elected to the West Valley City council in 2017, succeeding a 16-year incumbent and becoming the city's first Pacific Islander councilmember, and he was re-elected in 2022.

=== Utah House of Representatives ===
Fitisemanu ran for the Utah House of Representatives in 2024 for the 30th district, which Republican incumbent Judy Weeks-Rohner was vacating to run for Utah State Senate. He defeated former Republican representative Fred Cox in the general election. He and Verona Mauga, are the first Samoan Americans elected to the Utah State Legislature.

== Personal life ==
Fitisemanu and his wife, Lucia Carvalho, and their two daughters reside in West Valley City, Utah. He holds the registered Samoan chiefly title "Laufou," bestowed upon him by the village of Toamua-Puipa'a. His father, Jacob Fitisemanu Sr., successfully ran for two terms as president of the Samoan Community Council of Utah and spearheaded notable Polynesian community initiatives, including the building of the first cricket pitch in Utah (at Southridge Park in Taylorsville). His relative, John, was a plaintiff in Fitisemanu v. United States.

== Electoral history ==
=== 2024 ===
Utah's 30th House District General Election, 2024
Party	Candidate	Votes	%
Democratic	Jake Fitisemanu	7,371	52.53%
Republican	Fred Cox	6,662	47.47%
Total votes		14,033	100%
