= Gerald K. Maloney =

American politician

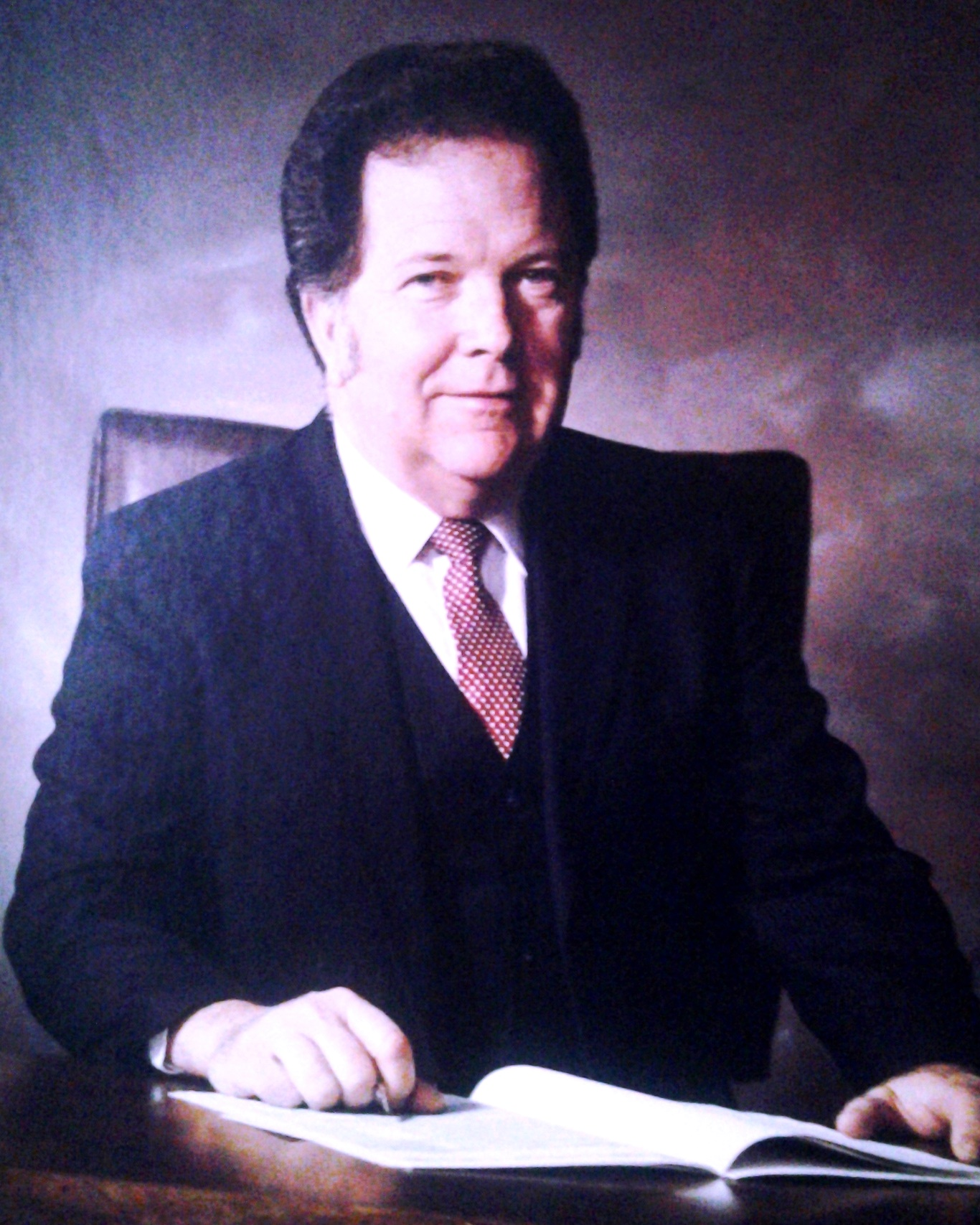

Mayor of West Valley City
- In office January 4, 1982 – January 1986
- Preceded by: Henry H. "Hank" Price
- Succeeded by: Michael Embley

Gerald K. Maloney is an American politician who served as the second mayor of West Valley City, Utah.

== Election as West Valley City Mayor ==
Maloney was a one-time critic of West Valley City's incorporation in 1980, but the businessman from the Hunter area of the city saw an opportunity to end the bickering between the city's original three commissioners when he jumped into the mayoral race of 1981. West Valley City's form of government at incorporation was composed of three commissioners: Mayor Henry H. "Hank" Price, Renee Mackay, and Jerald Wagstaff. City residents voted to change the form of government to a council-manager form on July 28, 1981, and all three commissioners entered the race for mayor. Maloney announced his bid for mayor in mid-September, believing that a new form of government merited new leadership. "You don't put old wine in new bottles," he said.

The primary election of October 6, 1981 stunned the city's commissioners, as outsider Maloney led with 1,769 votes (30%), followed by Wagstaff with 1,689 (29%). Incumbent Mayor Hank Price (1,448 votes, 29%) and Mackay (972 votes, 17%) were eliminated. After the primary, Price mounted a write-in campaign to retain his seat, and Mackay endorsed her fellow city commissioner Wagstaff. "We don't need an all new Council to go unnecessarily through the growing pains we've been through," she said.

On general election day, November 3, 1981, one-third of the city's eligible voters came out to elect Maloney as the city's second mayor. With a large turnout in his home area of Hunter, Maloney captured 42.7% (3,913 votes), Wagstaff polled 36.4% (3,329 votes), and Price posted an impressive showing for a write-in with 20.9% (1,912 votes). Mayor Maloney and the city's first city council were inaugurated on January 4, 1982 at Granger High School, with Judge David Kent Winder administering the oaths of office.

== Defeat for reelection ==
Maloney announced for reelection in 1985, and did well in the October 8 primary. The mayor garnered 2,019 votes (58%) and moved on to the general with at-large City Councilman Michael Embley, who had 1,012 votes (29%). Challengers Frank Domichel (269 votes, 8%) and Lance Park (187 votes, 5%) were eliminated. However, Embley came back to defeat the sitting mayor on November 5, 1985, by a vote of 4,880 to 3,282 (60% to 40%).

Maloney later moved to Draper, Utah, where he was a neighbor and friend of his successor Brent F. Anderson.

== Notes ==
Preceded by Henry H. "Hank" Price	Mayors of West Valley City; 1982 – 1986	Succeeded by Michael Embley
