= Karen Kwan =

Karen Kwan may refer to:

- Karen Kwan (figure skater) (born 1978), American former figure skater
- Karen Kwan (politician) (born 1964), American politician
