= List of mayors of West Valley City, Utah =

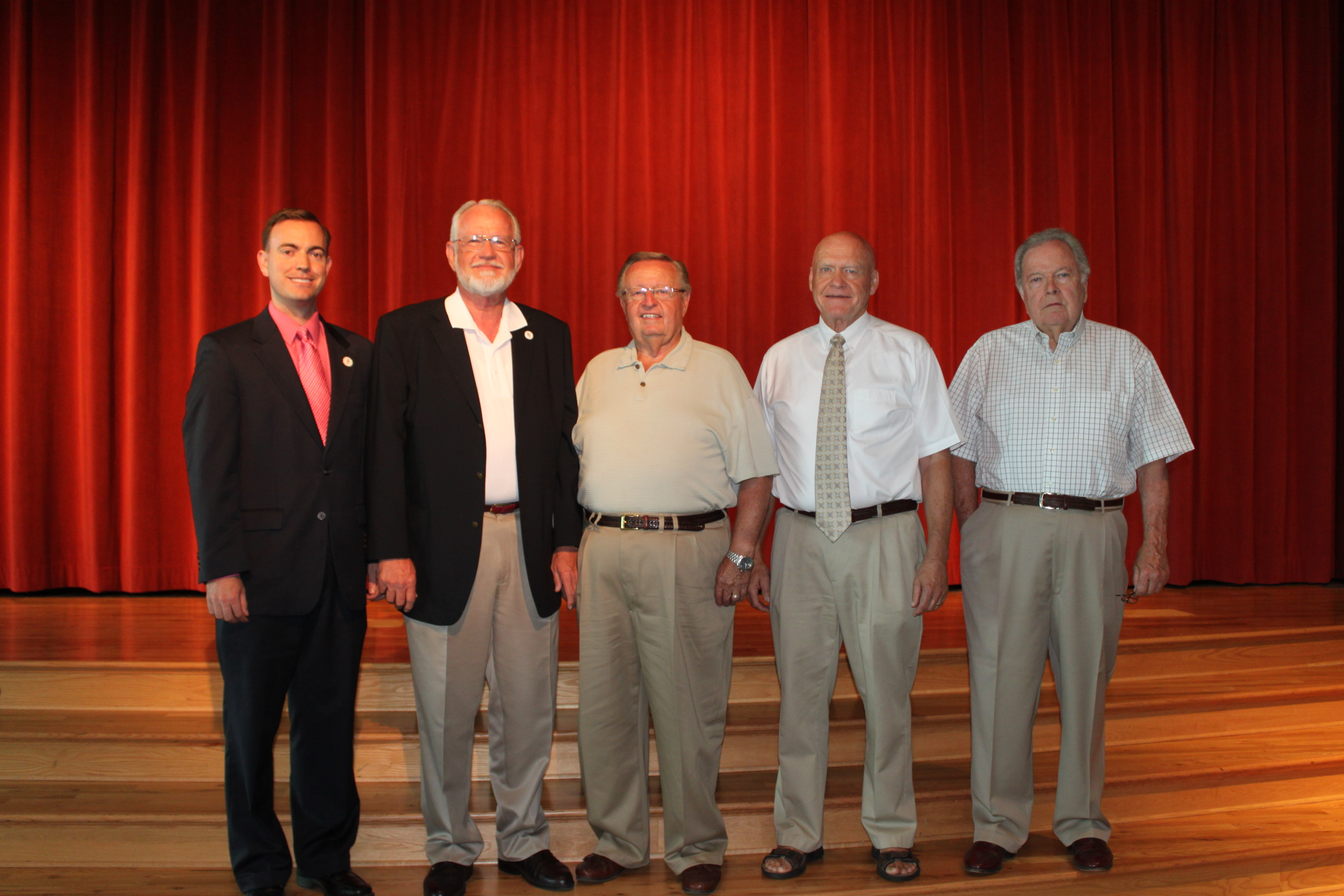
All of West Valley City's living mayors attended a July 28, 2010 event at the Utah Cultural Celebration Center to celebrate the 30th anniversary of the city's incorporation. From left to right, Mike Winder, Dennis J. Nordfelt, Brent F. Anderson, Michael Embley, and Gerald K. Maloney. Henry H. "Hank" Price and Gearld L. Wright were deceased.

This is a list of mayors of West Valley City, Utah, United States. West Valley City was incorporated on July 1, 1980. The mayor of West Valley City is a non-partisan position in a council-manager government.

No.	Name	Term began	Term ended
1	Henry H. "Hank" Price	July 1, 1980	January 4, 1982
2	Gerald K. Maloney	January 4, 1982	January 1986
3	Michael Embley	January 1986	May 20, 1987
4	Brent F. Anderson	May 1987	January 1994
5	Gearld L. Wright	January 1994	July 25, 2002
6	Dennis J. Nordfelt	August 20, 2002	January 4, 2010
7	Mike Winder	January 4, 2010	January 6, 2014
8	Ron C. Bigelow	January 6, 2014	January 4, 2022
9	Karen Lang	January 4, 2022	Incumbent
