= Kory Holdaway =

American politician

Member of the Utah House of Representatives from the 34th district
- In office January 1, 1999 – November 3, 2009
- Succeeded by: Johnny Anderson

Personal details
- Born: September 8, 1958 (age 67) Salt Lake City, Utah
- Party: Republican

Kory Holdaway (born September 8, 1958) is an American politician who served in the Utah House of Representatives from the 34th district from 1999 to 2009.
