= Mike Winder =

American historian (born 1976)

Member of the Utah House of Representatives from the 30th district
- In office January 1, 2017 – December 31, 2022
- Preceded by: Fred Cox
- Succeeded by: Judy Weeks-Rohner

Mayor of West Valley City
- In office January 4, 2010 – January 6, 2014
- Preceded by: Dennis Nordfelt
- Succeeded by: Ron C. Bigelow

West Valley City Councilman
- In office January, 2006 – January 2010

Personal details
- Born: January 27, 1976 (age 50) Salt Lake City, Utah
- Party: Republican
- Spouse: Karyn Hermansen
- Children: Four
- Profession: Business executive and author

Michael Kent Winder (born January 27, 1976) is an American businessman, author, and politician. He was the mayor of West Valley City, Utah between 2010 and 2014. A Republican, he subsequently represented District 30 in the Utah House of Representatives for three terms, from 2017 to 2022. He is the author of fourteen published books on Utah and LDS history, including Presidents and Prophets: The Story of America's Presidents and the LDS Church.

== Education and family ==
Winder was born in Salt Lake City, Utah and graduated from Taylorsville High School. From 1995 to 1997 he was a missionary in Taipei, Taiwan for the Church of Jesus Christ of Latter-day Saints.

He holds a BA in history and an MBA from the University of Utah. He also completed an executive leadership program at Harvard University's John F. Kennedy School of Government.

Winder is married to Karyn Hermansen, who was elected to the Granite School District Board of Education in November 2014. They have four children.

== Business career ==
Winder was Business Development Manager for West Valley City from 2000 to 2004, during which time he also chaired the Chamber West Economic Development Committee.

From 2004 to 2009 he was vice president of marketing for Winder Farms. He was director of public affairs for The Summit Group Communications from 2009 to 2011.

Winder founded Neptune Strategies in 2012, a marketing and development firm. His principal client has been Friends of Traditional Banking, a Super PAC, where he has served as executive director.

Winder later was employed as a vice president of community development and director of entrepreneurship programs for Zions Bank from 2014 to 2017. He was hired as economic development manager in 2017 and later promoted to be assistant city manager for the city of Millcreek, Utah following their incorporation. In March 2022, Winder became Millcreek's city manager.

== Political career ==
Winder has served as a member of the state and Salt Lake County Republican Party Executive Committees, deputy campaign manager for Congressman James V. Hansen, and chair of the Research and Policy Committee for the Jon Huntsman, Jr. for Governor campaign. He is the founder of the GenX GOP Network.

He was elected to an at-large seat on the West Valley City Council in November 2005 with 71% of the vote over 12-year incumbent Barbara Thomas.

He was elected on November 3, 2009 as the seventh mayor of West Valley City, Utah, with 76% of the vote; his opponent was Kevin Fayles.

At twenty-nine, he was the youngest council person in city history, and when sworn in on January 4, 2010, at age thirty-three, he became the youngest mayor in city history.

In 2012, Winder and former county council member Mark Crockett emerged from the Salt Lake County Republican Convention field of six to face off for the GOP nomination for county mayor. Crockett narrowly defeated Winder in the GOP primary election, 50.7% to 49.3%.

In 2016, Winder ran for the Utah State House of Representatives, defeating incumbent Fred Cox in the Salt Lake County Republican Convention by a delegate vote of 62% to 38%. He went on to defeat his Democratic opponent Frank Bedolla 59% to 41%. He was sworn in as a member of the Utah State House of Representatives on January 1, 2017.

Winder was re-elected in 2018, following a victory over former-Representative Fred Cox in a Republican county convention rematch 67% to 33% and a general election win over Democrat Robert Burch, Jr. 57% to 43%. Winder was elected to a third term in 2020 in a rematch with Burch, 58% to 42%. In 2022, Rep. Winder announced he will be retiring from the legislature, as he was appointed unanimously to be the new city manager for Millcreek. He took office on March 7.

During the 2022 legislative session, Rep. Winder served on the Business, Economic Development, and Labor Appropriations Subcommittee, the House Economic Development and Workforce Services Committee, and the House Transportation Committee, where he served as its vice-chair.

== Political positions and significant legislation ==
In 2022, Rep. Winder sponsored HB178, "Rank Choice Voting Amendments", which would require "ranked-choice voting to be used to multi-candidate primaries and general elections." The bill was going to be considered in committee but was taken off the agenda in the last minute after a big push from groups on the political right to oppose the bill.

In 2022, Rep. Winder voted to cut the income tax rate from 4.95% to 4.85%. He also supported creating a state earned income tax credit. In an op-ed Winder wrote in the Deseret News, he said that "there is no public policy with a better record of drawing potential workers into the workforce than [the Earned Income Tax Credit]," and that "we cannot have an income tax cut without doing something additional that would be significant for Utah's low-and moderate-income working families."

In 2022, Rep. Winder voted against banning transgender athletes from participating in female school sports. When Governor Spencer Cox vetoed the bill, Winder was one of only two Republicans who opposed the override. In defending his position, Rep. Winder said, "As a fiscal conservative I cannot vote for a bill to throw away tax dollars in a losing lawsuit or to cost the state in economic opportunities all while only serving as a message of hate while being mired in court. . . . Utah can do better!"

== 2022 sponsored legislation ==
Bill number	Bill title	Status
HB0093S01	Juror and Witness Fee Amendments	House/Filed - 3/04/2022
HB0094	Post Council Membership Amendments	Governor Signed - 3/22/2022
HB0116	Medical Billing Amendments	House/Filed - 3/04/2022
HB00170	Student Resource Officer Funding	House/ filed - 3/04/2022
HB0173	Jordan River Recreation Area Amendments	Governor Signed - 3/23/2022
HB0178	Ranked-choice Voting Amendments	House/ filed - 3/04/2016
HB0307	Earned Income Tax Credit Amendments	House/Filed - 3/04/2022
HB0315	Effective Teachers in High Poverty Schools Incentive Program Amendments	Governor Signed - 3/23/2022
HB0348S01	Public Employees Retirement Amendments	House/Filed - 3/04/2022
HB0362	Taxing Entity Amendments	House/Filed - 3/04/2022
HB0380	School Enrollment Amendments	Governor Signed - 3/24/2022
HB0465	Cultural and Community Engagement Amendments	House/Filed - 3/04/2022
HB0466	Special Service District Study	House/Filed - 3/01/2022

== Author and historian ==
An historian, he is the author of sixteen published books on Utah and LDS history, including Presidents and Prophets: The Story of America's Presidents and the LDS Church. In 2005, Winder was appointed by Governor Jon Huntsman Jr. to a four-year term on the Utah Board of State History, and reappointed in 2009. In 2012, he was appointed by Governor Gary Herbert to a four-year term on the Advisory Board for the Office of Museum Services.

Winder presented an academic paper as part of the Abraham Lincoln sesquicentennial in 2009 and was published in the Journal of the Theodore Roosevelt Association in 2011. As mayor in 2012, he also authored the first photographic history of West Valley City for Arcadia Publishing. Winder is a past president of the Utah British Isles Association.

== Controversies ==
In 2011, Winder wrote articles promoting West Valley City for the Deseret News and KSL.com under the assumed name "Richard Burwash". The name was a pseudonym inspired by a 16th-century ancestor of Winder's. In the articles, Winder quoted himself as mayor.

Winder confessed to the use of a pseudonym and said he wrote the articles because he was "frustrated that the newspaper had drastically reduced its city government coverage after layoffs last year but not its crime coverage and wanted to try to restore balance." Winder accepted a reprimand by the West Valley City Council, resigned from his job with a public relations firm, and issued a public apology to his constituents.

In 2017, he sent robocalls to display a false source phone number in telephone caller ID systems, causing it to appear that the calls were coming from the cell phone of the leader of Americans for Prosperity (AFP). AFP had sent out attack mail that falsely criticized Winder's stance on an issue that never came before a vote on the House floor. This practice, known as "spoofing", is illegal. AFP filed a complaint with the Utah Attorney General's office, but later withdrew the complaint after receiving a public apology from Winder. Winder said "I was taken aback by the mail piece, and in a knee-jerk reaction sent some calls I shouldn't have. I appreciate Evelyn and her team and look forward to a better working relationship going forward."

In 2017, Winder was also accused of using multiple user accounts to edit the Wikipedia article about him, to promote his accomplishments and remove unflattering information. He refused to confirm or deny the allegation.

== Publications ==
- John R. Winder: Pioneer, Temple Builder, Dairyman; Horizon Publishers; ISBN 978-0-88290-676-8; (1999; Hardback)
- Counselors to the Prophets; Eborn Books; ISBN 1-890718-04-1; (2001; Hardback)
- The Christmas Animals: A Children's Book illustrated by Lindsey E. Ayres; Eborn Books; ISBN 1-890718-09-2, (2002; Hardback)
- Ned Winder: The antics and adventures of a Utah Legend; with Bret R. Bassett, (2002; Paperback)
- Presiding Bishops; Eborn Books; ISBN 1-890718-10-6, (2003; Hardback)
- Utah in 2050: Glimpses of Our Future; Eborn Books; ISBN 1-890718-11-4, (2003; Hardback)
- Presidents and Prophets: The Story of America's Presidents and the LDS Church; Covenant Communications; ISBN 1-59811-452-2, (September 2007; Hardback)
- Life Lessons from Fathers of Faith: Inspiring True Stories About Latter-day Dads with Gary W. Toyn; Covenant Communications; ISBN 978-1-59811-603-8, (2010; Hardback)
- When the White House Comes to Zion with Ronald L. Fox; Covenant Communications; ISBN 978-1-60861-232-1, (2011; Hardback)
- It's Fun to Be the Mayor: A children's book illustrated by Andrea Vitali; Eborn Books; ISBN 978-1-890718-72-5; (2011; Hardback)
- Images of America: West Valley City; Arcadia Publishing; ISBN 978-0-7385-9541-2; (2012; Paperback)
- Called to Serve: Celebrating Missionary Work around the World; Covenant Communications; ISBN 978-1-62108-667-3; (2014; Paperback)
- Guy Stuff in the Scriptures; Covenant Communications; ISBN 978-1-62108-753-3; (2014; Paperback)
- Favorite Scriptures of 100 American Leaders; Plain Sight Publishing; ISBN 978-1-46212-313-1; (2019; Hardback)
- Hidden in Hollywood: The Gospel Found in 1001 Movie Quotes; Eborn Books; ISBN 978-1-60919-907-4; (2023; Paperback)
- Gold from the Plates: Greatest Hits From the Book of Mormon Sermons; Cedar Fort, Inc.; ISBN 978-1-4621-5145-5; (2026; Paperback)

== Notes ==
Preceded by Dennis J. Nordfelt	Mayors of West Valley City; 2010 – 2014	Succeeded by Ron C. Bigelow
