= Brent F. Anderson =

American politician and electrical engineer

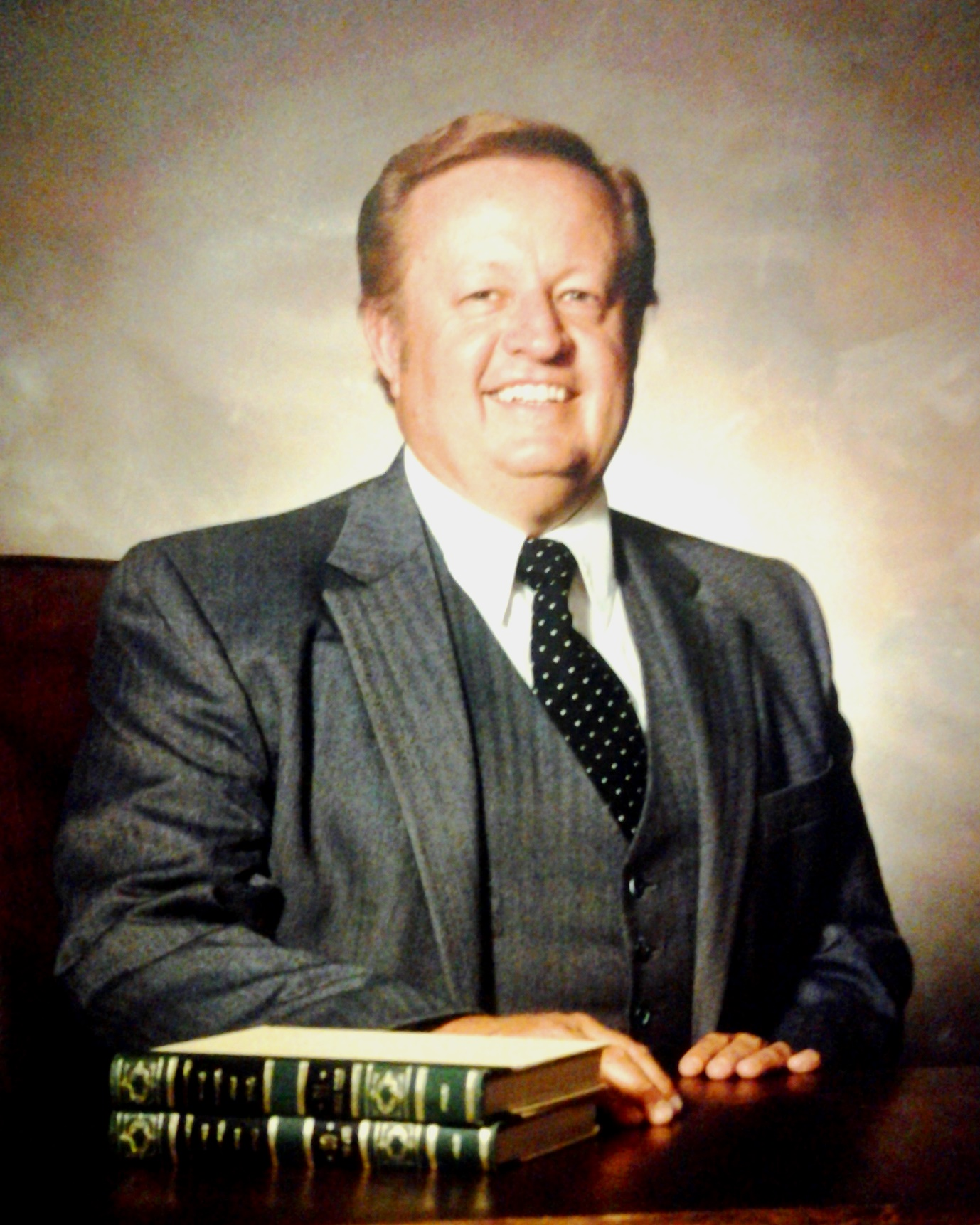

Mayor of West Valley City
- In office May 1987 – January 1994
- Preceded by: Michael Embley
- Succeeded by: Gearld L. Wright

Personal details
- Born: October 15, 1932; Granger, Utah
- Died: June 18, 2013 (aged 80); Utah
- Spouse: Delores Ashby
- Children: four
- Profession: electrical engineer

Brent F. Anderson (October 15, 1932 – June 18, 2013) was an American politician and electrical engineer who served as the fourth mayor of West Valley City, Utah, from 1987 until 1994.

== Early life ==
He was born in Granger, Utah, a community that later incorporated as part of West Valley City, to Lester and LaPreal Anderson. In 1961 he married Delores Ashby in the Salt Lake Temple and together they had four children and 13 grandchildren. Anderson served in the U.S. Navy and graduated with a degree from the University of Utah in electrical engineering. He worked as an electrical engineer for Sperry-Univac and was a systems manager at UNISYS.

== Political career ==
Anderson was involved with West Valley City since its incorporation in 1980. When the city switched its form of government from a commissioner form to a council-manager form in 1982, Anderson was elected to the original West Valley City Council.

In January 1986, Anderson was selected by his peers to serve as mayor pro tem. After Mayor Michael Embley resigned in May 1987, the council chose Anderson to replace him as mayor. Anderson defeated Councilmember Gearld L. Wright in a special election that fall to finish out the remaining two years of Embley's term. In the 1989 election, Mayor Anderson's two opponents dropped out and he won without opposition. On July 6, 1993, Anderson announced that he would not seek reelection, and he completed his service in January 1994.

Anderson's administration saw West Valley City government move into a new city hall, the construction of West Ridge Golf Course, and the beginnings of Bangerter Highway. After serving as mayor, Anderson moved to Draper, Utah, where he was served on their planning commission.

== Notes ==
Preceded by Michael Embley	Mayors of West Valley City; 1987 – 1994	Succeeded by Gearld L. Wright
