= Fred Cox (politician) =

American politician (born 1961)

Fred C. Cox

Member of the Utah House of Representatives from the 30th district
- In office January 1, 2015 – December 31, 2016
- Preceded by: Janice Fisher
- Succeeded by: Michael K. Winder

Member of the Utah House of Representatives from the 32nd district
- In office January 10, 2011 – December 31, 2012
- Preceded by: Ron C. Bigelow

Personal details
- Born: 1961 (age 64–65) Salt Lake City, Utah
- Party: Republican
- Spouse: Aleta
- Education: Salt Lake Community College
- Occupation: Architect

Fred C. Cox (born 1961) is a Republican former member of the Utah State House of Representatives, representing the 30th District in 2015 to 2016 and the 32nd District from 2011 to 2012.

== Early life and career ==
Cox is a Utah native and lifelong resident of Salt Lake County. He attended the University of Utah and Utah Technical College (now Salt Lake Community College), graduating with an Associate of Applied Science in Architectural Technology. He started his own architectural firm in West Valley City, UT in 1996.

== Political career ==
Cox has served as a State Republican Delegate beginning in 2002, is an elected member of the State Republican Central Committee representing Salt Lake County, served briefly as the Salt Lake County Republican House District 32 Chair, and has been a campaign volunteer and/or consultant for several state and local races starting in 1994. He has been involved in government affairs for both AIA Utah and ChamberWest Regional Chamber of Commerce along with church based community service.

Cox was originally elected to be the party nominee in a special election on January 6, 2011 to replace Ron C. Bigelow who announced on December 22, 2010 he was to be the Executive Director of the Governor's Office of Planning and Budget as of January 1, 2011. Cox was appointed January 10, 2011 by Governor Gary Herbert and completed Bigelow's term for 2011 and 2012. In 2012 Cox ran for the new House District 30 against another incumbent Rep. Janice Fisher and lost in a close race. In 2014 Cox ran for the open seat against Michael D. Lee and won by a very slim margin.

During the 2016 Legislative session, Cox served on the Higher Education Appropriations Subcommittee, the House Government Operations Committee, and the House Judiciary Committee.

In 2019 and 2020, Cox was the original sponsor, one of five, for the 2019 Utah Tax Referendum. The bill, 2019 SB 2001 was later repealed by the legislature and Governor. 144,675 petition signatures were verified meeting the requirements in 26 of 29 counties with an estimate of between 152,000 and 170,000 signatures gathered. Verification was stopped.

In February 2020, Cox announced he was running for Salt Lake County District 2. In April he survived the Republican convention and made it to the June Primary, where he lost.

== 2016 sponsored legislation ==
Bill Number	Bill Title	Status
HB0011S02	Referendum Amendments	House/ filed - 2/10/2016
HB0065S01	Exemption from Daylight Saving Time	House/ filed - 3/10/2016
HB0069	Qualified Political Party Amendments	House/ filed - 2/17/2016
HB0080	Vehicle Impound Amendments	House/ filed - 2/18/2016
HB0101S02	Disabled Adult Guardianship Amendments	Governor Signed - 3/30/2016
HB0108	Licensing Amendments	House/ filed - 3/10/2016
HB0109	Construction Trades Education Amendments	House/ filed - 3/10/2016
HB0125	Fire Code Amendments	House/ filed - 3/10/2016
HB0152S01	Voted and Board Local Levy Modifications	House/ filed - 3/10/2016
HB0256	Net Metering of Electricity Amendments	House/ filed - 3/10/2016
HB0261	Wood Burning Stoves Amendments	House/ filed - 3/10/2016
HB0269	Recycling of Copper Wire	Governor Signed - 3/28/2016
HB0361	Air Quality Modifications	House/ filed - 3/10/2016
HB0429	Specie Legal Tender Amendments	House/ filed - 3/10/2016
HJR011	Joint Resolution Designating Utah as a Purple Heart State	House/ to Lieutenant Governor - 3/5/2016

Cox passed three of the bills he introduced in 2016. Two of the bills were added to other bills that also passed. He did not floor sponsored any Senate bills. Cox also passed bills in 2011, 2012 and 2015.

== Elections ==
=== 2024 ===
In 2024, Cox ran for an open seat for House District 30. He won at the County Republican Convention by 2/3 of the delegate votes, on April 13, but still faced a primary. On June 25, 2024, Cox was ahead in the Primary, and on July 9, 2024, Salt Lake County Clerk certified the election with Cox as the winner by 116 votes. The General Election was November 5, 2024. Final Results were COX 6,662 (47.47%) FITISEMANU 7,371 (52.53%)

=== 2014 ===
In 2014, Cox ran for election in House District 30. He won the Republican Party nominee at the County Republican Convention on April 12, 2014 with 68.75% of the vote over Carbon Lundgren. He faced Michael D. Lee, Democratic Party Nominee, in the General Election in November. Cox was behind on election day but won by 47 votes, after 2 weeks when all the votes were counted. Final results were Cox 3,076 votes (50.38%) v Lee 3,029 votes (49.62%) out of 6,105 votes cast.

=== 2012 ===
Cox ran for election in House District 30 due to redistricting. He ran unopposed in the County Republican Convention on April 21, 2012. In the general election on November 6, 2012, Cox lost to another incumbent Rep. Janice Fisher, from House District 29. Final voting results were Fisher 5,385 votes vs Cox 5,029 votes, 11 write-in votes and 10,425 votes cast.
