= Johnny Anderson (politician) =

American politician

Member of the Utah House of Representatives from the 34th district
- In office November 25, 2009 – December 31, 2016
- Preceded by: Kory Holdaway
- Succeeded by: Karen Kwan

Personal details
- Party: Republican
- Education: University of Phoenix
- Website: vote4johnny.com

Johnny Anderson is an American politician and a former Republican member of the Utah House of Representatives. He represented District 34 from his November 25, 2009 appointment to fill the vacancy caused by the resignation of Representative Kory Holdaway until January 2017. He announced he would not seek re-election after the 2016 legislative session.

== Early life and career ==
Anderson earned his BS in business management from the University of Phoenix. He owns a chain of daycares and lists his profession as an early childhood educator and small business owner.

== Political career ==
- 2014 Anderson was unopposed in the Republican convention and won the general election with 3,901 votes (53.4%) against Democratic nominee Karen Kwan.
- 2012 Anderson was unopposed for the June 26, 2012 Republican primary and won the November 6, 2012 general election with 6,255 votes (53.4%) against Democratic nominee Celina Milner.
- 2010 Anderson was unopposed for the June 22, 2010 Republican primary and won the November 2, 2010 general election with 3,989 votes (62.2%) against Democratic nominee Clover Meaders.

During the 2016 legislative session, Anderson was on the Business, Economic Development, and Labor Appropriations Subcommittee, the House Political Subdivisions Committee and the House Transportation Committee.

== 2016 sponsored legislation ==
| Bill number | Bill name | Status |
|---|---|---|
| HB0055S01 | State Highway System Amendments | Governor Signed - 3/18/2016 |
| HB0060 | Class B and Class C Road Fund Amendments | Governor Signed - 2/12/2016 |
| HB0168 | Transportation Funding Modifications | Governor Signed - 3/4/2016 |
| HB0187S01 | Animal Shelter Amendments | House filed - 2/23/2016 |
| HB0209 | Public Transit District Board County Appointment Amendments | Governor Signed - 3/23/2016 |
| HB0296S01 | Transportation Funding Revisions | House/ filed - 3/10/2016 |
| HB0407 | Sexual Conduct with a Minor Amendments | House/ filed - 3/10/2016 |
| HB0415S01 | Motor Vehicle Accident Cost Recovery | House/ filed - 3/10/2016 |
| HB0416 | Driver License for Youths in Foster Care | House/ filed - 3/10/2016 |

Anderson passed four of the nine bills he introduced, giving him a 44.4% passage rate. He also floor sponsored four Senate bills.
