= Craig Hall (politician) =

American politician

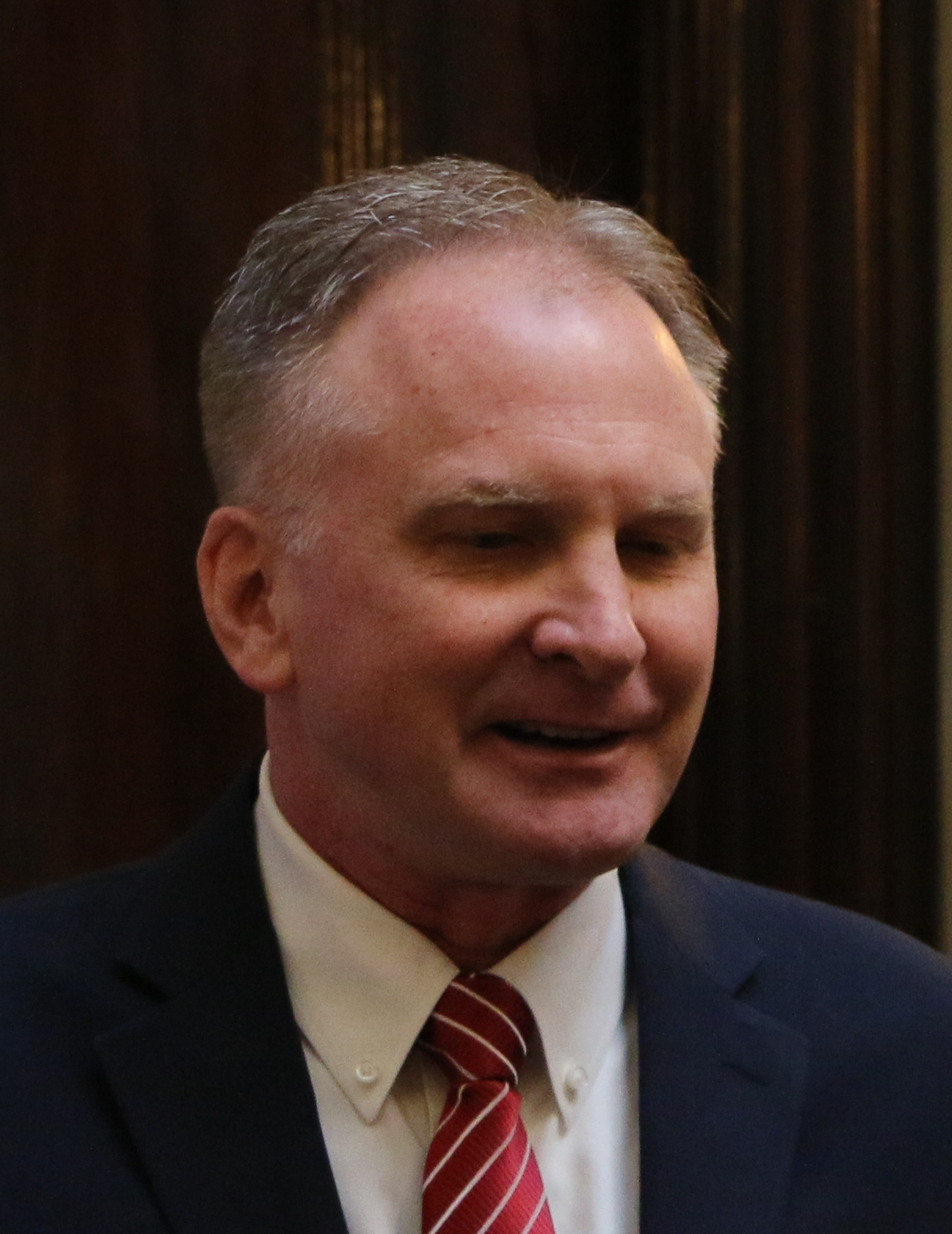

Member of the Utah House of Representatives from the 33rd district
- In office January 1, 2013 – November 8, 2021
- Preceded by: Neal Hendrickson
- Succeeded by: Judy Weeks-Rohner

Personal details
- Party: Republican
- Education: Utah State University; Baylor Law School
- Profession: Lawyer
- Website: votecraighall.com

Craig Hall is an American politician and a former Republican member of the Utah House of Representatives representing District 33. In 2021 Hall was appointed by Governor Spencer Cox to a judgeship on Utah's 2nd district court.

== Early life and career ==
Hall graduated from Taylorsville High School, earned his BA from Utah State University, and his JD from Baylor University's Baylor Law School. When not at the legislature, Hall works as an attorney for Intermountain Healthcare. Hall has been named one of Utah's “Legal Elite” by the Utah Business Magazine.

== Elections ==
To challenge District 33 incumbent Democratic Representative Neal Hendrickson in 2012, Hall was selected by the Republican convention from four candidates, and won the November 6, 2012 general election with 4,234 votes (52.8%) against Democratic nominee Liz Muniz, who had won the Democratic Primary against Representative Hendrickson.

In 2014, Hall filed for reelection. Liz Muniz ran against him as the Democratic nominee. Hall won the November 4, 2014 general election with 2,788 votes (58.78%) to 1,955 votes (41.22%).

Utah House of Representatives, District 33

Year	Republican	Votes	Pct.	Democrat	Votes	Pct.
2012	Craig Hall	4,234	52.75%	Liz Muniz	3,782	47.12%
2014	Craig Hall	2,788	58.78%	Liz Muniz	1,955	41.22%

== Political career ==
During the 2016 legislative session, Hall served on the Infrastructure and General Government Appropriations Subcommittee, the House Judiciary Committee, and the House Health and Human Services Committee.

== 2016 sponsored legislation ==
Bill number	Bill name	Bill status
HB0083S01	Campaign Finance Disclosures in Municipal Elections	Governor Signed - 3/21/2016
HB0089	Office of State Debt Collection Reporting Amendments	Governor Signed - 3/23/2016
HB0110S03	Election Law Changes	House/ filed - 3/10/2016
HB0155S02	Reporting of Child Pornography	Governor Signed - 3/28/2016
HB0160S03	Justice Court Amendments	Governor Signed - 3/22/2016
HB0227	Electronic Driver License Amendments	Governor Signed - 3/22/2016
HB0263	Fraud Amendments	Governor Signed - 3/21/2016
HB0288S03	Educational Records Protection Amendments	Governor Signed - 3/29/2016
HJR001	Proposal to Amend Utah Constitution - Judges of Courts Not of Record	House/ filed - 3/10/2016
HJR017	Joint Resolution Expressing Support for Designating November 2016 as National Bladder Health Month	House/ filed - 3/10/2016

Hall passed seven of the ten bills he introduced, giving him a 70% passage rate. He also floor sponsored SB0099S02 Transparency for Political Subdivisions.
