= Janice Fisher =

American politician (1938–2024)

Janice M. Fisher

Member of the Utah House of Representatives from the 30th district
- In office January 1, 2013 – December 31, 2014
- Preceded by: Brent H. Goodfellow
- Succeeded by: Fred Cox

Member of the Utah House of Representatives from the 29th district
- In office April 19, 2005 – December 31, 2012

Personal details
- Born: November 28, 1938 Salt Lake City, Utah, U.S.
- Died: October 22, 2024 (aged 85) West Valley City, Utah, U.S.
- Party: Democratic
- Spouse: Barry
- Education: LDS Business College
- Profession: Homemaker

Janice M. Fisher (née Duke, November 28, 1938 – October 22, 2024) was an American politician and a Democratic member of the Utah House of Representatives, who represented District 30 from January 1, 2013, to December 31, 2014. Fisher was consecutively a member from her appointment by Utah Governor Olene S. Walker to fill the vacancy caused by the appointment of Representative Brent H. Goodfellow to the Utah State Senate, from April 19, 2005, until December 31, 2012, in the District 29 seat. Fisher did not run for District 30 in 2014 and retired December 31, 2014.

== Background ==
Born on November 28, 1938, Fisher attended LDS Business College and was a homemaker. She later lived in West Valley City, Utah with her husband Barry. Fisher died there on October 22, 2024, at the age of 85.

== Political career ==
Fisher was unopposed for the 2006 Democratic Primary and won the four-way November 7, 2006, General election with 2,272 votes (47%) against Republican nominee Phillip Conder, Constitution candidate Susan Sorenson, and Personal Choice Party candidate Annaliese Hinkel; Conder and Sorenson had both run for the seat in 2004.

Fisher was unopposed for the June 24, 2008, Democratic Primary and won the three-way November 4, 2008, General election with 4,275 votes (60.1%) against returning 2006 Republican opponent Phillip Conder and Constitution candidate Grant Pearson, who had run for Utah State Senate in 2006.

Fisher was unopposed for the June 22, 2010, Democratic Primary and won the November 2, 2010, General election with 2,954 votes (55.7%) against Republican nominee Shirene Saddler.

Redistrict to District 30, and with appointed Democratic Representative Brian Doughty redistricted to District 26, Fisher was unopposed for the June 26, 2012, Democratic Primary and won the November 6, 2012, General election with 5,385 votes (51.7%) against Republican nominee incumbent Representative Fred Cox.

During the 2014 General Session Fisher served on the House Government Operations Committee and the House Transportation Committee. On March 13, 2014, Fisher announced that she would retire December 31, 2014.

== 2014 Sponsored Legislation ==
Bill number	Bill title	Status
HCR001S01	Concurrent Resolution Designating Call Your Military Hero Day	Governor Signed - 3/25/2014
