= Michael Embley =

American politician

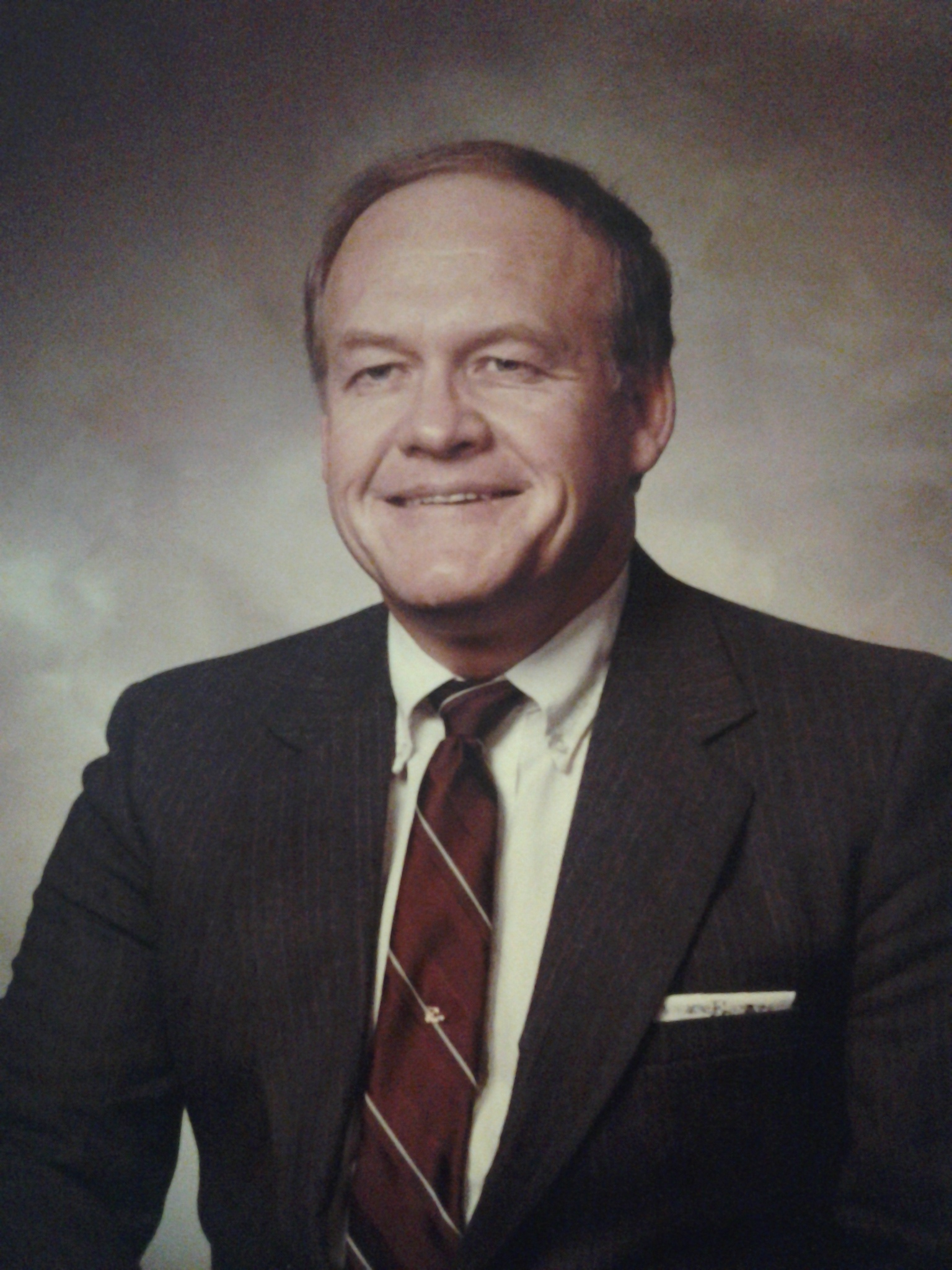

Mayor of West Valley City
- In office January 1986 – May 20, 1987
- Preceded by: Gerald K. Maloney
- Succeeded by: Brent F. Anderson

Personal details
- Born: July 30, 1938 (age 86)
- Spouse: Kathleen Rayona
- Profession: Government administrator

Michael Roper Embley (born July 30, 1938) is an American politician who served as the third mayor of West Valley City, Utah.

== Career ==
Embley was city coordinator for St. George, Utah from 1970 to 1973. He then served as the city manager of Cedar City, Utah from 1973 to 1978. In 1983 he served a short appointed term as acting Salt Lake County Treasurer, and later served as a board member of the Salt Lake Valley Water Conservancy District. Embley was general manager of the Kearns Improvement District when he decided to get involved in West Valley City politics.

== West Valley City Politics ==
Embley was elected to represent District 1 on the West Valley City Council on November 3, 1981 over Ray White with a vote of 53% to 47%. Two years later, November 8, 1983, Embley was elected to a citywide at-large council seat over E. Reed Palmer with a vote of 58% to 42%. Two years later he ran again for office, this time against incumbent Mayor Gerald K. Maloney. Although Embley only had half the votes of Maloney in the October 8, 1985 primary election, he came back to defeat the sitting mayor on November 5, 1985, by a vote of 4,880 to 3,282 (60% to 40%). Embley was sworn in as mayor January 1986.

== Resignation ==
On April 30, 1987 Mayor Embley was arrested for soliciting sex from a police officer posing as a prostitute in downtown Salt Lake City. He pleaded no contest to the misdemeanor charge May 6 and was sentenced to five days in jail, but the term was waived in lieu of a $200 fine. On May 20, flanked by his family at a news conference, Embley resigned and told reporters and city employees that he felt the incident raised questions about his leadership and created undue hardship for other elected leaders. He maintained that he had only been joking with the Salt Lake City police decoy and considered himself the victim.

Embley later moved to Holladay, Utah, where he lived with his late wife Phyllis.

== Notes ==
Preceded by Gerald K. Maloney	Mayors of West Valley City; 1986 – 1987	Succeeded by Brent F. Anderson
