= Presidents and Prophets =

Book by Michael K. Winder

- Author: Michael K. Winder
- Language: English
- Subject: The relationships between the Mormons and the Presidents of the United States
- Genre: Historical
- Publisher: Covenant Communications
- Publication date: September 2007
- Publication place: United States
- Media type: Print (hardcover)
- Pages: 428 pp
- ISBN: 1-59811-452-2
- OCLC: 173994728
- Dewey Decimal: 289.3/32 22
- LC Class: BX8643.P6 W56 2007

Presidents and Prophets: The Story of America's Presidents and the LDS Church is a book, spoken word album on CD, and direct-to-DVD documentary film of the same title by Michael K. Winder, a member of the Utah Board of State History. All three were published in 2007 by Covenant Communications, a division of Salt Lake City-based Deseret Book. Published during the 2008 presidential campaign candidacy of former Massachusetts governor Mitt Romney, they provide historical context for the relationship between the Mormons and the American Presidency.

The book has 43 chapters, one for each president from George Washington to George W. Bush. Each chapter explores the relationship between a President of the United States and the Church of Jesus Christ of Latter-day Saints (the LDS Church). Political figures, such as Utah Senator Orrin Hatch (a member of the LDS Church), as well as academics, such as the University of Florida's Kenneth Wald, have praised it.

The documentary includes interviews with dozens of experts who share accounts about the interactions between the Mormons and presidents of the United States. Academics such as Columbia University's Richard Bushman participate, as do politicos such as U.S. Senator Bob Bennett and former Senator Jake Garn. The book's author, Mike Winder, narrates.

The talk CD is a one-hour "fireside" address, also by Mike Winder, summarizing some of the more colorful anecdotes in the book.
