= Dennis Nordfelt =

American politician

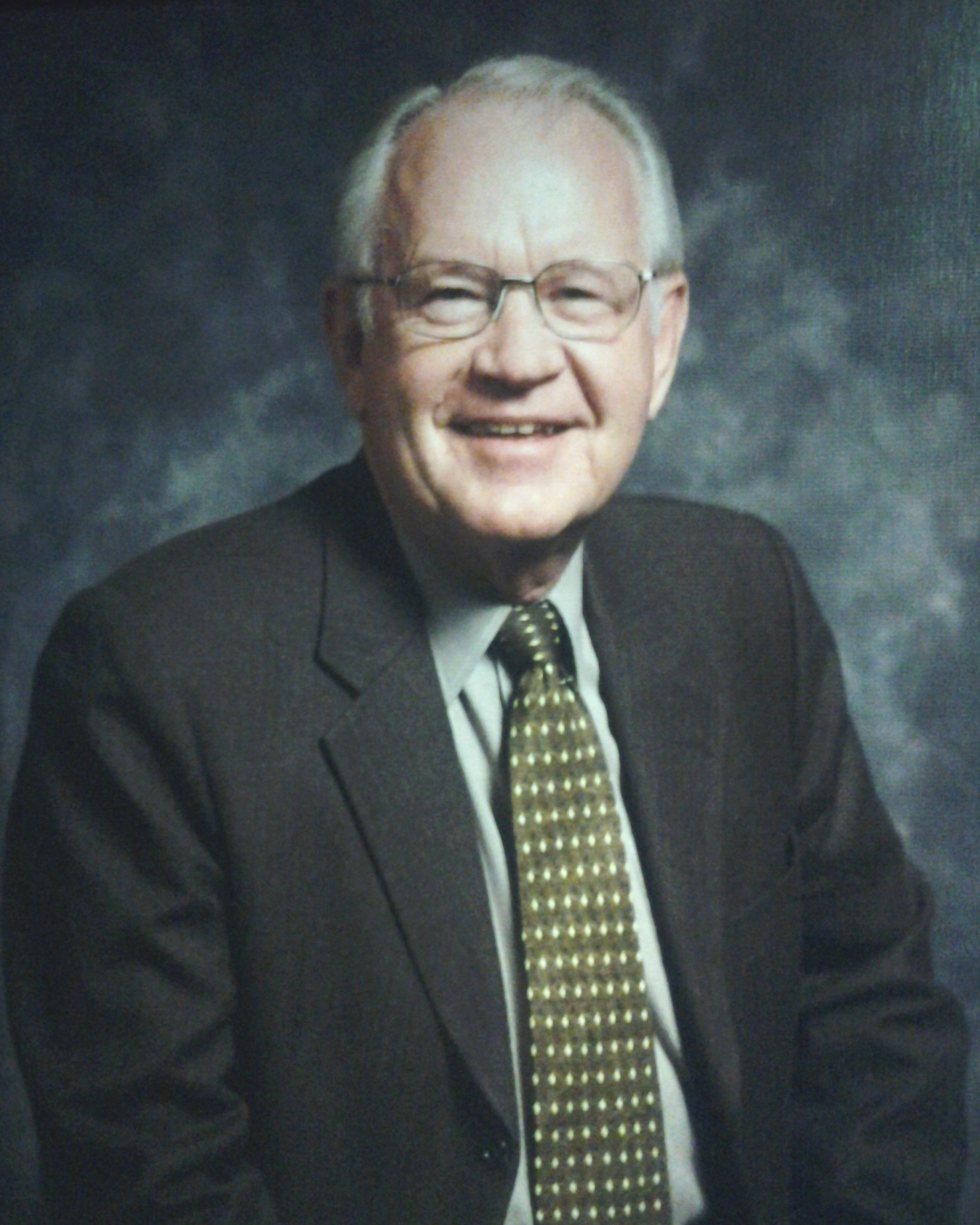

Mayor of West Valley City
- In office August 20, 2002 – January 4, 2010
- Preceded by: Gearld L. Wright
- Succeeded by: Mike Winder

Personal details
- Born: March 2, 1943 Salina, Utah
- Died: August 30, 2014 (aged 71) West Valley City, Utah
- Spouse: Glenda Carlson
- Children: nine
- Profession: Police executive

Dennis J. Nordfelt (March 2, 1943 – August 30, 2014) was an American politician who served as the sixth mayor of West Valley City, Utah, from 2002 until 2010. He was also superintendent of the Utah Highway Patrol.

== Early life ==
Born in Salina, Utah to Ellen Frances Tolboe and Charles Larsen Nordfelt, Jr., Nordfelt grew up in Moab, Utah where he was student body president of Grand County High School and lettered in four sports. He attended classes at Southern Utah University, Weber State University and Brigham Young University.

In May 1967, he joined the Utah Highway Patrol, and was appointed Superintendent of the UHP by Governor Scott M. Matheson in August 1981. Four years later he was reappointed Superintendent by Governor Norman Bangerter.

== Career with West Valley City ==
Upon retiring from the Utah Highway Patrol, Nordfelt was hired as Chief of the West Valley City Police Department, serving from July 1, 1987 to August 28, 1998. Following his career in law enforcement, Nordfelt served as the city's Olympic Coordinator, helping West Valley City act as a venue city in the 2002 Winter Olympics and Paralympic Games.

He was appointed Mayor upon the death of Gearld L. Wright in August 2002, elected to complete Mayor Wright's term in November 2003, and elected to serve a full four-year term in his own right in November 2005.

Nordfelt is married to the former Glenda Carlson and the father of nine children. In November 2013, one of their sons, Lars Nordfelt, was elected to an at-large seat on the West Valley City Council.

He died at 71 on August 30, 2014.

Preceded by Gearld L. Wright	Mayors of West Valley City; 2002 – 2010	Succeeded by Mike Winder
