= Brett Garner =

American politician

Member of the Utah House of Representatives from the 31st district
- In office January 30, 2023 – December 31, 2024
- Preceded by: Karen Kwan
- Succeeded by: Verona Mauga

Personal details
- Party: Democratic
- Education: University of Utah (BS)

Brett Garner is an American politician from the state of Utah. He served as a member of the Utah House of Representatives for District 31. He was elected by delegates of the Utah Democratic Party after his predecessor Karen Kwan was appointed to the Utah State Senate.

== Education ==
Garner earned a Bachelor of Science in Political Science from the University of Utah in 2005. He also earned a certificate in international relations from the same institution.

== Career ==
Garner served on the following committees:

- Higher Education Appropriations Subcommittee
- House Economic Development and Workforce Services Committee
- House Transportation Committee
- Political Subdivisions Interim Committee
- Transportation Interim Committee

Garner ran for re-election in 2024 but was defeated by Verona Mauga at the Democratic nominating convention.

== Personal life ==
Garner is a stay-at-home father.
