= Friends of Traditional Banking =

- Abbreviation: FOTB
- Formation: 2012 in Salt Lake City, Utah
- Type: Super PAC; Industry trade group Advocacy group
- Legal status: non-partisan
- Purpose: Decreasing federal regulation of banking by encouraging support for key races each election cycle.
- Location: Salt Lake City, Utah
- Region served: United States
- Members: 15,000
- Chairperson: John Boyer, Chairman, KANZA Bank, Kingman, Kansas
- Founder and treasurer: Howard Headlee, President & CEO, Utah Bankers Association
- Executive Director: Mike Winder
- Website: friendsoftraditionalbanking.com

The Friends of Traditional Banking (FOTB) is an independent expenditure-only committee, or super PAC, with the aim of improving the political and regulatory environment for the banking industry in the United States by decreasing federal regulation, particularly by repealing the Dodd–Frank Wall Street Reform and Consumer Protection Act. As a non-partisan trade group, it selects a small number of Congressional races in each election cycle (typically two) and encourages their members to donate directly to these campaigns.

The organization is headquartered in Salt Lake City, Utah and has over 15,000 members. They are led by an executive committee including bank executives and bank association executives, advised by a Board of bank executives from each state, and an Advisory Council of bank association leaders. Their membership and leadership includes execs affiliated with the American Bankers Association, Independent Community Bankers of America, and other industry groups.

== Campaigns ==
During the 2012 senate elections, the group came out in support of Dean Heller, a former banker in Nevada. They also supported Scott Brown in the Senate race in Massachusetts against CFPB creator Elizabeth Warren. Although Warren won in Massachusetts, Heller won a narrow victory over Congresswoman Shelley Berkley in Nevada.

In the 2014 senate elections, the group helped direct over 1,000 donations totaling over $500,000 to Cory Gardner in Colorado and another $500,000 plus to Joni Ernst in Iowa. Both Gardner's opponent Sen. Mark Udall and Ernst's opponent Rep. Bruce Braley were defenders of the Dodd-Frank Act and advocated for increased expansion of credit unions. Ernst and Gardner both won on Election Day.

== Reaction ==
When first announced in 2012, Friends of Traditional Banking was described by Salon as a "smokescreen of a sobriquet," and that it was primarily an effort to revoke "a key provision of Dodd-Frank known as the Volcker Rule" while the Huffington Post said it was part of the banks' "plan for world domination." National Journal commented that "the bankers' non-super PAC super PAC" was "taking a novel approach" that promised to be both effective and transparent.

After the 2014 elections, Politico commented that "The industry went to bat in a big way for Gardner, routing him money through Friends of Traditional Banking,".
