= Judy Weeks-Rohner =

American politician

Member of the Utah House of Representatives
- In office November 9, 2021 – December 31, 2024
- Preceded by: Craig Hall
- Succeeded by: Jake Fitisemanu
- Constituency: 33rd district (2021–2023); 30th district (2023–2024)

Personal details
- Party: Republican

Judy Weeks-Rohner is an American politician who served as a member of the Utah House of Representatives from the 30th district. She is a member of the Republican Party.

== Political career ==
Before serving in the Utah State Legislature, Weeks-Rohner was a member of the Granite School Board. She also served as the liaison to the State Board of Education under Governor Mike Leavitt. In 2021, Weeks-Rohner led a signature-gathering effort to force a referendum on repealing a major tax reform package approved by the state legislature in 2019 which cut income taxes and increased a per-child exemption but increased taxes on "food, fuel and some services." However, the Legislature voted to repeal the tax reform bill before the referendum could take place.

After Craig Hall resigned his House seat to accept an appointment by Gov. Spencer Cox to serve as a state judge, Weeks-Rohner ran to replace him and won the special election.

In the 2022 legislative session, Weeks-Rohner served on the Executive Offices and Criminal Justice Appropriations Subcommittee, House Education Committee, and the House Judiciary Committee.

In 2024, Weeks-Rohner unsuccessfully ran for a seat in the Utah Senate.

== Political positions ==
=== Tax policy ===
Weeks-Rohner supports repealing the food tax in Utah. She criticized her fellow Republicans for not joining in supporting for the food tax repeal proposal by Rosemary Lesser, saying, "I think they’re listening to big businesses and corporations, and I want them to listen to the common man."
