= Ron C. Bigelow =

American politician

Mayor of West Valley City
- In office January 6, 2014 – January 4, 2022
- Preceded by: Michael K. Winder
- Succeeded by: Karen Lang

Personal details
- Born: November 7, 1948 (age 77) Green River, Utah, U.S.
- Party: Republican
- Spouse: Charlene
- Children: 4
- Education: A.A.S., Salt Lake Community College; B.S., University of Utah
- Occupation: Certified Public Accountant

Ron C. Bigelow (born 1948) was the eighth mayor of Utah's second largest city, West Valley City. He was Director of the Office of Planning and Budget for the State of Utah. He was elected for nine terms as a member of the Utah State House of Representatives District 32, representing West Valley City, before stepping down at the invitation of the Governor.

Previously he had served as House Chair of the Executive Appropriations Committee (state budget committee), Vice-Chairman of the Executive Appropriations Committee, Vice-Chairman of the Education Committee, Chairman of the Executive Offices, Criminal Justice sub-appropriations committee and Chairman of the Retirement and Independent Entities Committee, Government Operations Committee, Higher Education sub-appropriations, and the National Conference State Legislatures Revenue and Budgets Committee.

He was recognized with the Friend of the Taxpayer award by the Utah Taxpayers Association, Guardian of Small Business by the National Federation of Independent Businesses and Champion of Children by NetSmartz.

Utah has long been recognized as either the best or one of the best financially managed states in the United States of America by numerous national publications. This trend continued while he served as the Co-Chair of the committee that sets the state budget.

== Career ==
Previous to his work with the Governor, he was the Manager of Finance in the Church of Jesus Christ of Latter-day Saints Missionary Department. He has also worked in their administration offices in Mexico and Chile.

He has worked for other local companies such as Salt Lake International Center, Busch Development and Thompson Flying Service.

Bigelow received his education at the University of Utah and Salt Lake Community College.

== Personal ==
He is married to Charlene Larsen Bigelow, his wife of 37 years. They have four grown sons and one grandson.

For the last twelve years, he has served as president of The Bigelow Society, a national organization of over 700 members researching the genealogy of John Bigelow and Mary Warren of the 18th century in Watertown Massachusetts.
