= Gearld Wright =

American politician (1933–2002)

Gearld L. Wright
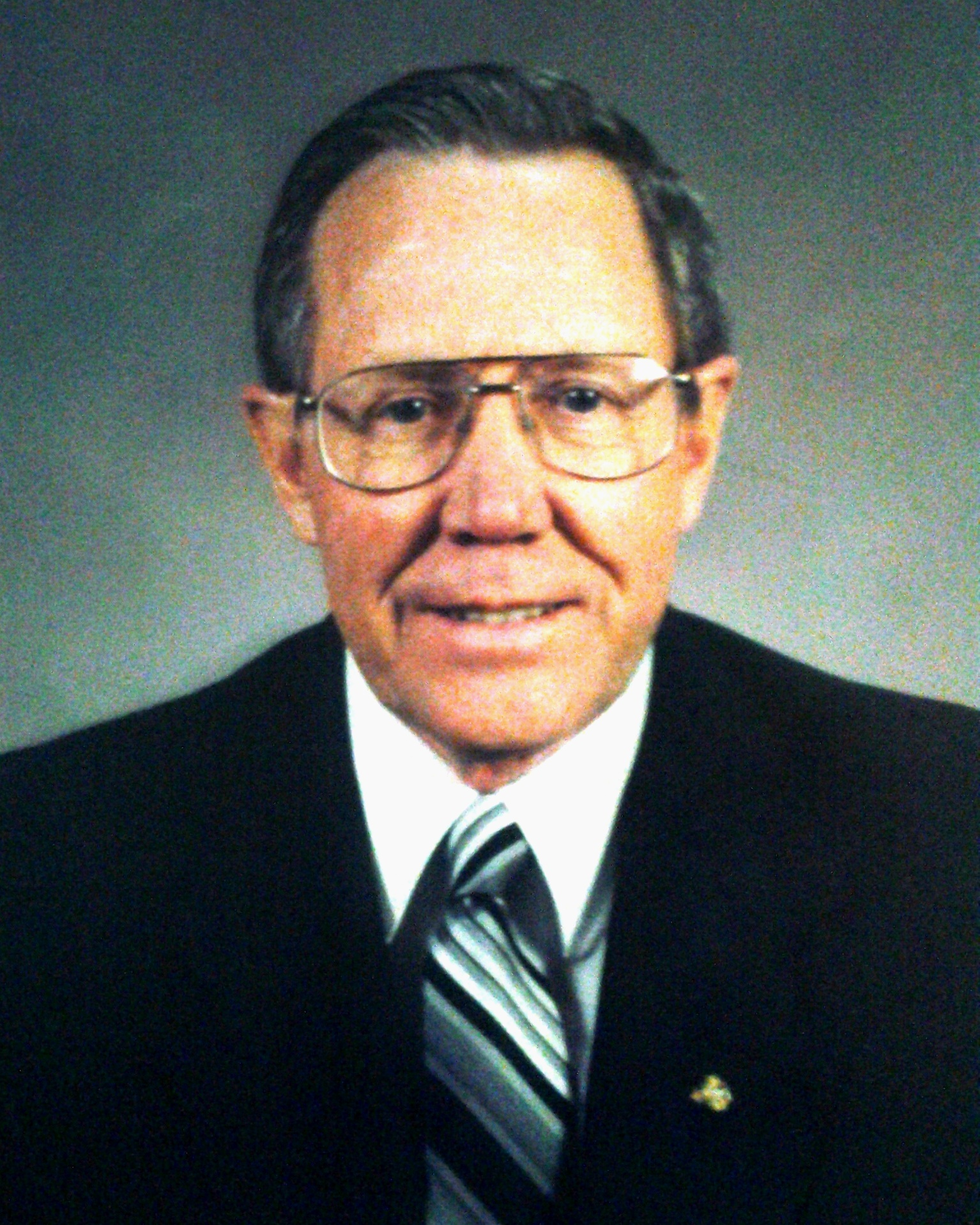

Mayor of West Valley City
- In office January 1994 – July 25, 2002
- Preceded by: Brent F. Anderson
- Succeeded by: Dennis J. Nordfelt

Personal details
- Born: February 22, 1933 Lyman, Wyoming
- Died: July 25, 2002 (aged 69) Utah
- Cause of death: Stroke
- Spouse: Lila Lynn Florence
- Children: Six
- Profession: Educator

Gearld Lewis Wright (February 22, 1933 – July 25, 2002) was an American politician who served as the fifth mayor of West Valley City, Utah from 1994 to 2002.

== Early life ==
Wright was born in Lyman, Wyoming to Alton T. Wright and Ida Mabel Jensen Wright. He graduated from South High School and Brigham Young University, was married to Lila Lynn Florence, and was the father of six. Wright served in the U.S. Air Force in the Korean War and taught social studies in junior high and high schools for 30 years before retiring in 1987.

== Political career ==
Wright was an at-large city councilman for six years, and was chair of the city's building authority for six years. He ran unsuccessfully for mayor in 1987, being defeated by Brent F. Anderson, but was successful in 1993 when he defeated state senator Bill Barton. He was reelected in 1997 overwhelmingly over F. Kenneth Olafson by a three-to-one margin, becoming the first mayor in West Valley City history to be elected to two full terms. In 2001 he won an unprecedented third term over city councilmember Janice Fisher, but did not complete that term due to his sudden death resulting from a massive stroke on July 25, 2002.

Mayor Wright embraced the city's diversity, guided the city as a venue city during the 2002 Olympic Winter Games, and oversaw the development of the E Center, Hale Centre Theatre, Family Fitness Center, and the beginnings of what would become the Utah Cultural Celebration Center. He also began a sister city relationship with Nantou, Taiwan.

Gearld L. Wright Elementary School in West Valley City was named after the former educator and city official in 2005, as was the "Gearld Wright Classic" girls fastpitch softball tournament (held June 30 – July 2 at the West Valley Family Fitness Center Softball Complex) in 2011.

Preceded by Brent F. Anderson	Mayors of West Valley City; 1994 – 2002	Succeeded by Dennis J. Nordfelt
