= Karen Kwan (politician) =

American politician (born 1964)

- 关玉嬚

Minority Caucus Whip

Member of the Utah State Senate from the 12th District
- Incumbent
- Assumed office January 17, 2023
- Preceded by: Karen Mayne

Member of the Utah House of Representatives
- In office January 1, 2017 – January 17, 2023
- Preceded by: Johnny Anderson
- Succeeded by: Brett Garner
- Constituency: 34th district (2017–2023); 31st district (2023)

Personal details
- Born: February 12, 1964 (age 62)
- Party: Democratic
- Education: Pepperdine University (BA, MA), University of Utah (Ed.D)

Karen Kwan (Simplified Chinese: 关玉嬚, born February 12, 1964) is an American politician serving Utah State Senate from the 12th district as minority whip. On January 16, 2023, she was selected by delegates of the Utah Democratic Party to replace resigning Senator Karen Mayne. Before her appointment to the Senate she served in the Utah House of Representatives, representing the 34th district from 2017 to 2023 (and briefly the 31st). She also previously served as the House Minority Whip.

== Education ==
Kwan has a bachelor's degree in psychology from Pepperdine University, an Ed.D. in educational leadership/policy from the University of Utah, and a master's degree in clinical psychology from Pepperdine University.

== Career ==
Kwan is an associate professor of psychology at Salt Lake Community College.

=== Public service ===
Kwan was first elected in 2016, defeating the Republican candidate.

During the 2018 legislative session, Kwan served on the Higher Education Appropriations Subcommittee; the Natural Resources, Agriculture, and Environmental Quality Appropriations Subcommittee; the Political Subdivisions Committee, and the Transportation Committee.

Kwan was reelected in November 2018 with 60.03 percent of the vote, defeating the Republican candidate. In 2020, Kwan was reelected to her third consecutive term by defeating Republican challenger David Young 57% to 43%.

During the 2022 Legislative Session, Rep. Kwan served on the Executive Appropriations Committee, the Higher Education Appropriations Subcommittee, the House Education Committee, the House Transportation Committee, the Legislative Management Committee, and the Subcommittee on Oversight.

== Political Positions and Significant Legislation ==
Kwan has been serving as minority whip in the Senate Democratic Caucus since November, 2024.

=== Tax Policy ===
Kwan supports having a Child Tax Credit. When speaking about President Biden's American Rescue Plan, she said the tax credit "benefitted approximately 491,000 Utah families, including more than 850,000 children, this year." In addition, she said that " the expanded Earned Income Tax Credit will serve about 138,000 Utah workers without dependent children."

=== Equal Rights Amendment ===
In 2020, Kwan sponsored a resolution that would ratify the Equal Rights Amendment to the US Constitution. The bill did not receive any committee assignment or hearing.

== Election history ==
Utah State Senate District 12, Special General Election, 2024
Party	Candidate	Votes	%
Democratic	Karen Kwan	18,424	56.5%
Republican	Judy Weeks-Rohner	14,201	43.5%

Utah House of Representatives, District 31 General Election, 2022
Party	Candidate	Votes	%
Democratic	Karen Kwan (incumbent)	5,528	61.9%
Republican	Andrew Nieto	3,407	38.1%

Utah House of Representatives, District 34 General Election, 2020
Party	Candidate	Votes	%
Democratic	Karen Kwan (incumbent)	8,558	57.0%
Republican	David Young	6,458	43.0%

Utah House of Representatives, District 34 General Election, 2018
Party	Candidate	Votes	%
Democratic	Karen Kwan (incumbent)	7,042	60.0%
Republican	David Young	4,702	40.0%

Utah House of Representatives, District 34 General Election, 2016
Party	Candidate	Votes	%
Democratic	Karen Kwan	6,558	54.45%
Republican	Macade Jensen	5,485	45.55%

Utah House of Representatives District 34, General Election, 2014
Party	Candidate	Votes	%
Republican	Johnny Anderson (incumbent)	3,901	53.4%
Democratic	Karen Kwan	3,408	46.6%

== Personal life ==
Kwan resides in Kaysville, Utah with her husband and three daughters.
