= Granger-Hunter, Utah =

Granger-Hunter
- Former CDP
- Location within the state of Utah Granger-Hunter (the United States)
- Coordinates: 40°42′24″N 111°58′43″W
- Country: United States
- State: Utah
- Counties: Salt Lake

Area
  - Land: 1.2 sq mi (3.1 km^{2})
- Elevation: 4,255.25 ft (1,297.00 m)

Population (1970)
  - Total: 9,029
  - Density: 7,500/sq mi (2,900/km^{2})
- Time zone: UTC-7 (Mountain (MST))
  - Summer (DST): UTC-6 (MDT)
- ZIP code: 84119
- Area code: 801
- FIPS code: 49-30790

Granger-Hunter was a census-designated place in Salt Lake County, Utah, USA, during the 1970 United States census. which comprises the communities of Granger and Hunter. The population in 1970 was 9,029. The census area, along with the neighboring community of Redwood, became part of the newly created West Valley City in 1980. The ZIP code serving the area is 84119.

== Geography ==
Located at 40.706543 north and 111.978487 west, the census area of Granger-Hunter was located southwest of Salt Lake City, northeast of Kearns and east of Magna. The land area of the CDP was 1.2 square miles and a housing unit count of 2,101.
