= 2024 United States Senate elections =

- November 5, 2024
- Class 1

34 (Note: 33 Class 1 seats, including both the concurring special and regular elections in California, as well as one Class 2 seat in special election) of the 100 seats in the United States Senate 51 (Note: Majority control in an evenly divided Senate is determined by the Vice President of the United States, who has the power to break tied votes in their constitutional capacity as President of the Senate; accordingly, Senate control requires 51 seats or 50 seats with control of the vice presidency.) seats needed for a majority
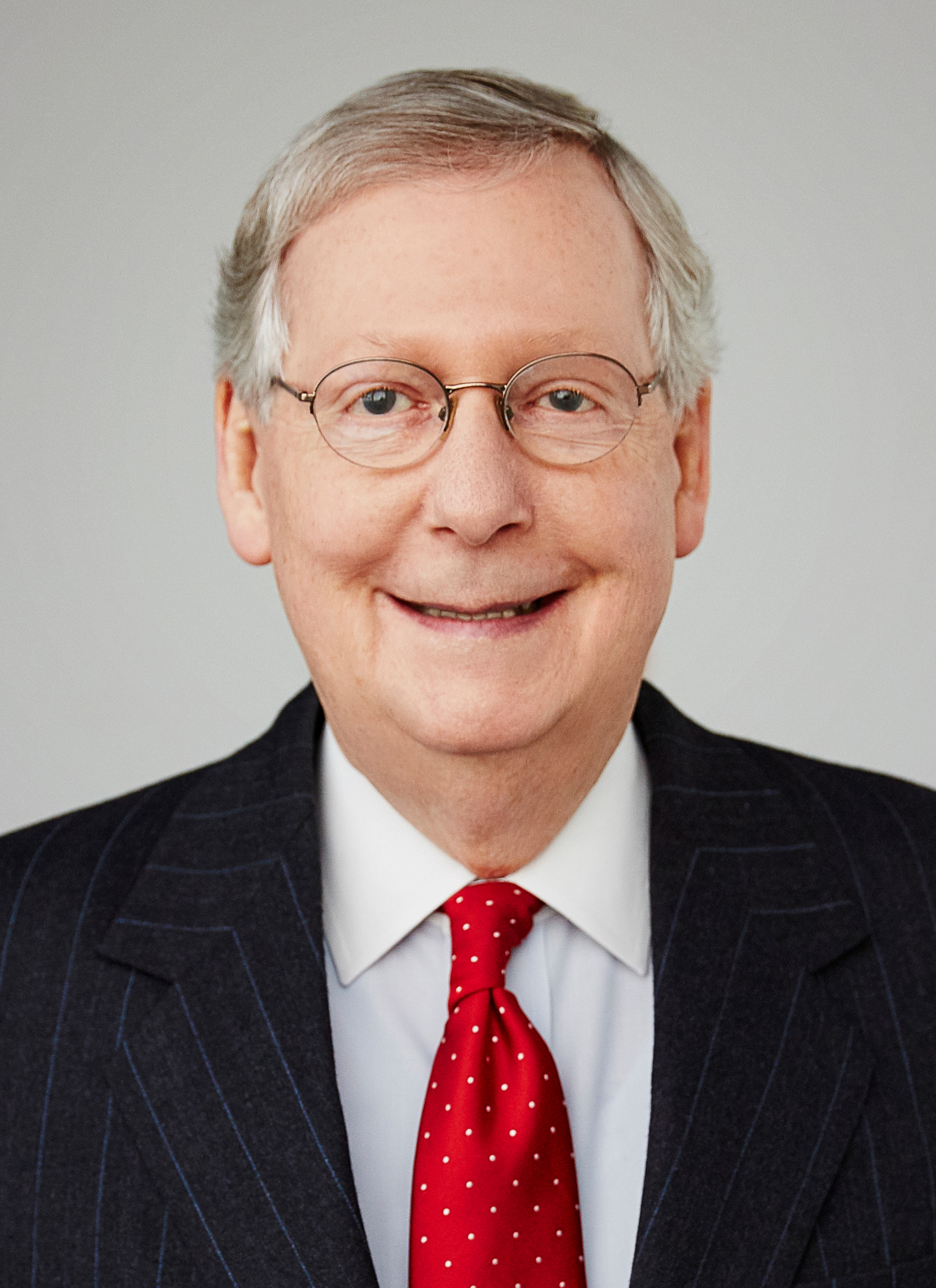

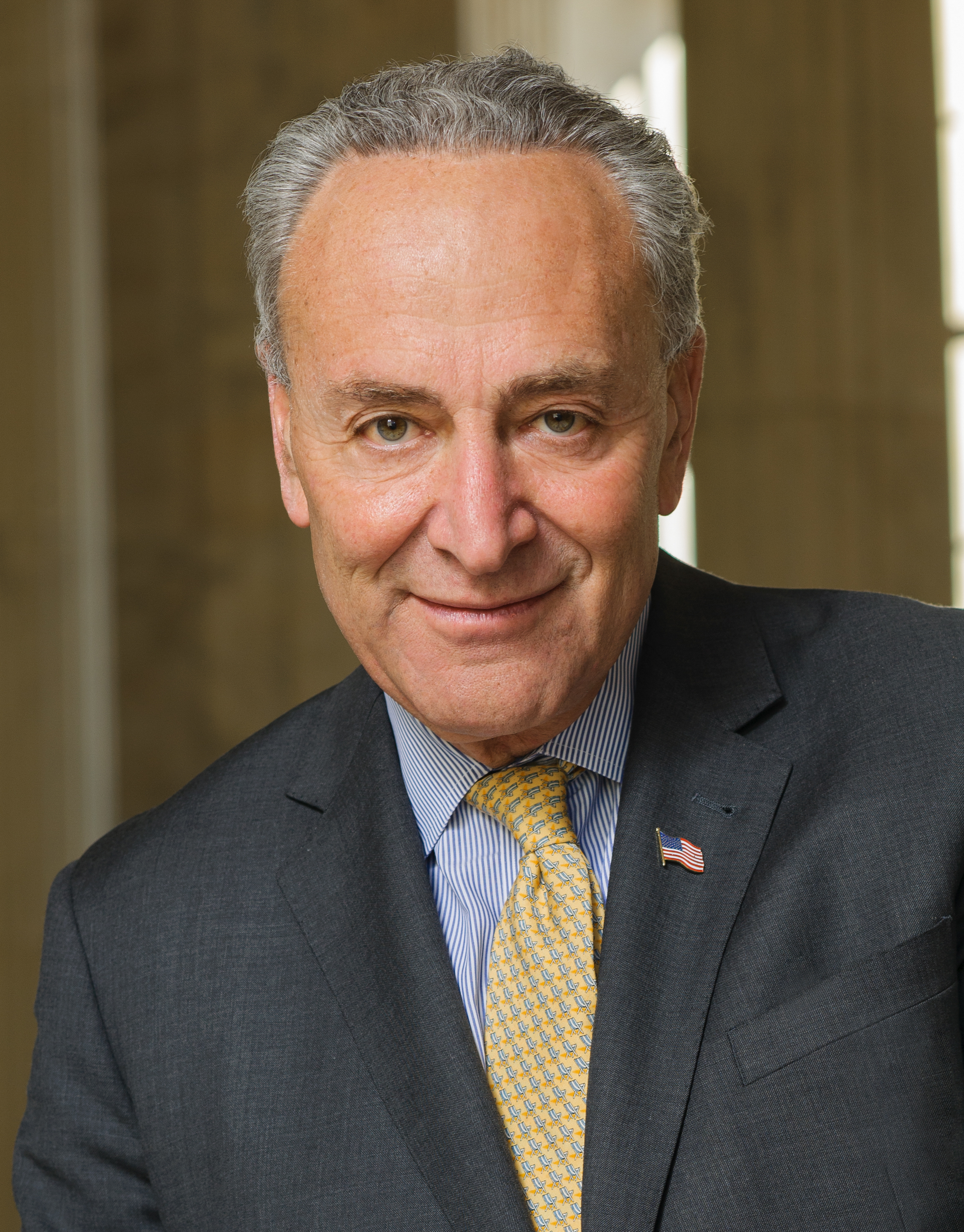
| | Majority party | Minority party |
|---|---|---|
| Leader | Mitch McConnell (retired as leader) | Chuck Schumer |
| Party | Republican | Democratic |
| Leader since | January 3, 2007 | January 3, 2017 |
| Leader's seat | Kentucky | New York |
| Seats before | 49 | 47 (Note: All four independent senators—Bernie Sanders (VT), Angus King (ME), Kyrsten Sinema (AZ), and Joe Manchin (WV)—caucused with the Democratic Party.) |
| Seats after | 53 | 45 (Note: Both independent senators—Bernie Sanders (VT) and Angus King (ME)—caucus with the Democratic Party.) |
| Seat change | ▲4 | ▼2 |
| Popular vote | 60,869,178 | 64,686,625 |
| Percentage | 46.83% | 49.77% |
| Seats up | 11 | 19 |
| Races won | 15 | 17 |
| | Third party |
| Party | Independent |
| Seats before | 4 |
| Seats after | 2 |
| Seat change | ▼2 |
| Popular vote | 1,366,024 |
| Percentage | 1.05% |
| Seats up | 4 |
| Races won | 2 |
- Results of the elections: Democratic hold Democratic gain Republican hold Republican gain Independent hold No election Rectangular inset (Nebraska): both seats up for election
Majority Leader before election
Chuck Schumer
Democratic
Elected Majority Leader
John Thune
Republican

Elections for the United States Senate were held on November 5, 2024. 33 Class 1 seats out of the 100 Senate seats were up for election, along with special elections in California and Nebraska. U.S. senators are divided into three classes whose six-year terms are staggered so that a different class is elected every two years. Class 1 senators faced election in 2024. Republicans flipped four Democratic-held seats, regaining a Senate majority for the first time in four years, and the most gains for either party since 2014. Republicans successfully defended all of their own seats for the first time since 2014. This was the first time since 1980 that Republicans flipped control of a chamber of Congress in a presidential year. These elections ran concurrently with the presidential election in which Kamala Harris lost to Donald Trump.

A total of 25 U.S. senators (14 Democrats, nine Republicans, and two independents) sought re-election in 2024, while seven senators declined to seek re-election. In addition, Democrats Sen. Laphonza Butler of California and Sen. George Helmy of New Jersey – each of whom had been appointed to their respective Senate seats – did not seek election in 2024. Concurrent with the 2024 regular Senate elections, two special Senate elections took place: one in California, to fill the final two months of Dianne Feinstein's term following her death in September 2023; and one in Nebraska, to fill the remaining two years of Ben Sasse's term following his resignation in January 2023.

Republicans won control of the U.S. Senate by flipping an open independent-held seat in West Virginia; defeating Democratic incumbents in Montana, Ohio, and Pennsylvania; and retaining all the seats they had previously held. Democrats flipped a seat in Arizona from an Independent who caucused with the Democrats. Democratic candidates were elected in Arizona, Michigan, Nevada, and Wisconsin, despite Trump having won those states. No Republican won in a state that Kamala Harris carried in the presidential election. This election cycle saw all but five Senate seats shift towards the Republicans from 2018, representing a record number of seats that shifted in the same direction as the party that concurrently won the White House. (Note: The five seats up for election that shifted away from the Republicans are Arizona, both of Nebraska's seats in Class 1 and Class 2, Utah, and Washington.)

== Partisan composition ==
All 33 Class 1 Senate seats, and one Class 2 seat, were up for election in 2024; Class 1 currently consisted of 20 Democrats, four independents who caucus with the Senate Democrats, (Note: Before the end of the 117th Congress, Kyrsten Sinema left the Democratic Party, and became an independent. She later announced her retirement in March 2024. In May 2024, Joe Manchin also announced he had left the Democratic Party, and registered as an independent, citing "broken politics" as the deciding factor in his decision.) and 10 Republicans.

Burgess Everett of Politico considered the map for these Senate elections to be highly unfavorable to Democrats. Democrats were to defend 23 of the 33 Class 1 seats, including three in states won by Republican Donald Trump in both 2016 and 2020. In contrast, there are no seats in this class held by Republicans in states won by Democrat Joe Biden in 2020. In the previous Senate election cycle that coincided with a presidential election (2020), only one senator (Susan Collins of Maine) was elected in a state that was simultaneously won by the presidential nominee of the opposite party.

Republican gains were attributed to better candidate quality compared to 2022 and to the coattails of Republican presidential candidate Donald Trump, who won the 2024 presidential election. Time's Eric Cortellessa wrote that the thesis of the Republicans' success boiled down to the simple slogan "Max out the men and hold the women," meaning emphasizing the economy and immigration, which Trump did "relentlessly." Cortellessa also mentioned Trump's minimization of his numerous controversies, and push-offs of criminal trials via "a combination of friendly judges and legal postponements" to after the election. He said Trump's "advanced age and increasingly incoherent trail rhetoric" were taken by voters in stride, and that "much of the country read Trump's legal woes as part of a larger corrupt conspiracy to deny him, and them, power." NPR wrote that "Americans have continued to chafe at higher than pre-pandemic prices and the lack of affordable housing," and that much of the voter placed the blame "squarely" on the Biden administration, wishing for the economy that had existed under the prior Trump Administration. NPR noted that demographics played an important role, with the share of Non-Hispanic White voters increasing from 67% to 71% of the electorate and the Republicans winning 46% of Latinos, as well as mentioning polling's "continued underestimation of Republicans' support nationally and in the key swing states."

=== Split-ticket voting ===
The 2024 Senate elections saw a notable increase in split-ticket outcomes compared to recent cycles. Four states that Donald Trump won in the presidential election also elected Democratic senators: Arizona, Michigan, Nevada, and Wisconsin. This represented approximately 12 percent of states with both contests on the ballot producing split outcomes—the highest share since 2012, when 18 percent of states split their tickets between presidential and Senate races.

Despite the split outcomes, the correlation between presidential and Senate race margins remained historically high at approximately 0.95, indicating that while some states elected different parties to each office, the margins in both races tracked closely together. The results also contributed to a historically low number of split Senate delegations, with only three states—Maine, Pennsylvania, and Wisconsin—having senators from different parties in the incoming 119th Congress, the lowest number since direct popular election of senators began in 1914.

== Summary results ==
=== Seats ===
| Parties | | | | Total |
| Parties | Democratic | Independent | Republican | Total |
| last elections (2022) | 49 | 2 | 49 | 100 |
| Before these elections | 47 | 4 | 49 | 100 |
| Not up | 28 | – | 38 | 66 |
| Class 2 (2020→2026) | 13 | – | 19 | 32 |
| Class 3 (2022→2028) | 15 | – | 19 | 34 |
| Up | 19 (Note: Included two interim appointees, Laphonza Butler (California) and George Helmy (New Jersey), who did not seek election.) | 4 (Note: The Independent Democrat incumbent Senators, Kyrsten Sinema and Joe Manchin, decided not to run re-election.) | 11 | 33 |
| Class 1 (2018→2024) | 21 | 2 | 10 | 33 |
| Special: Class 1 & 2 | 1 (Note: In California, both the regular election and the special election to finish the current 118th Congress was held.) | — | 1 (Note: Included the interim appointee from Nebraska (Pete Ricketts) running for election.) | 2 |
General election
| Incumbent retiring | 5 | 2 | 2 | 9 |
| Held by same party | 5 | — | 2 | 7 |
| Replaced by other party | ▼1 Independent replaced by ▲1 Republican ▼1 Independent replaced by ▲1 Democrat | | | 2 |
| Result | 6 | — | 3 | 9 |
| Incumbent running | 13 | 2 | 8 | 23 |
| Won re-election | 10 | 2 | 8 | 20 |
| Lost re-election | ▼3 Democrats replaced by ▲3 Republicans | | | 3 |
| Result | 10 | 2 | 11 | 23 |
Special elections
| Appointee retiring | 1 | — | — | 1 |
| Appointee running | – | – | 1 | 1 |
| Individuals elected | 1 | – | 1 | 2 |
| Result | 1 | – | 1 | 2 |
| Total Result | 16 | 2 | 16 | 34 |
| After these elections | 45 | 2 | 53 | 100 |

=== Votes ===
National results
| Parties | Votes | % | Seats | | | | |
| Parties | Votes | % | Total before | Up | Won | Total after | +/- |
|---|---|---|---|---|---|---|---|
| Democratic | 64,686,625 | 49.77 | 47 | 19 | 17 | 45 | 2 |
| Republican | 60,869,178 | 46.83 | 49 | 11 | 15 | 53 | 4 |
| Libertarian | 982,915 | 0.76 | 0 | 0 | 0 | 0 | |
| Green | 288,495 | 0.22 | 0 | 0 | 0 | 0 | |
| Constitution | 23,621 | 0.02 | 0 | 0 | 0 | 0 | |
| Other | 1,703,352 | 1.31 | 0 | 0 | 0 | 0 | |
| Independent | 1,366,024 | 1.05 | 4 | 4 | 2 | 2 | 2 |
| Write-in | 57,093 | 0.04 | 0 | 0 | 0 | 0 | |
| Total | 129,977,303 | 100.00 | 100 | 34 | 34 | 100 | |

== Change in composition ==
Each block represents one of the 100 seats in the U.S. Senate. "D#" is a Democratic/active senator, "I#" is an Independent senator, and "R#" is a Republican/active senator. They are arranged so that the parties are separated, and a majority is clear by crossing the middle.

=== Before the elections ===
Each block indicates an incumbent senator's actions going into the election. After the June 1, 2024 party change of West Virginia.

| D_{1} | D_{2} | D_{3} | D_{4} | D_{5} | D_{6} | D_{7} | D_{8} | D_{9} | D_{10} |
| D_{20} | D_{19} | D_{18} | D_{17} | D_{16} | D_{15} | D_{14} | D_{13} | D_{12} | D_{11} |
| D_{21} | D_{22} | D_{23} | D_{24} | D_{25} | D_{26} | D_{27} | D_{28} | D_{29} Conn. Ran | D_{30} Hawaii; Ran |
| D_{40} Va. Ran | D_{39} R.I. Ran | D_{38} Pa. Ran | D_{37} Ohio; Ran | D_{36} N.Y. Ran | D_{35} N.M. Ran | D_{34} Nev. Ran | D_{33} Mont. Ran | D_{32} Minn. Ran | D_{31} Mass. Ran |
| D_{41} Wash. Ran | D_{42} Wis. Ran | D_{43} Calif. Retired | D_{44} Del. Retired | D_{45} Md. Retired | D_{46} Mich. Retired | D_{47} N.J. Retired | I_{1} Maine; Ran | I_{2} Vt. Ran | I_{3} Ariz. Retired |
| Majority (with Independents) ↑ | | | | | | | | | I_{3} Ariz. Retired |
| R_{41} Mo. Ran | R_{42} Neb. (reg); Ran | R_{43} Neb. (sp); Ran | R_{44} N.D. Ran | R_{45} Tenn. Ran | R_{46} Texas; Ran | R_{47} Wyo. Ran | R_{48} Ind. Retired | R_{49} Utah; Retired | I_{4} W.Va. Retired |
| R_{40} Miss. Ran | R_{39} Fla. Ran | R_{38} | R_{37} | R_{36} | R_{35} | R_{34} | R_{33} | R_{32} | R_{31} |
| R_{21} | R_{22} | R_{23} | R_{24} | R_{25} | R_{26} | R_{27} | R_{28} | R_{29} | R_{30} |
| R_{20} | R_{19} | R_{18} | R_{17} | R_{16} | R_{15} | R_{14} | R_{13} | R_{12} | R_{11} |
| R_{1} | R_{2} | R_{3} | R_{4} | R_{5} | R_{6} | R_{7} | R_{8} | R_{9} | R_{10} |

=== After the elections ===
| D_{1} | D_{2} | D_{3} | D_{4} | D_{5} | D_{6} | D_{7} | D_{8} | D_{9} | D_{10} |
| D_{20} | D_{19} | D_{18} | D_{17} | D_{16} | D_{15} | D_{14} | D_{13} | D_{12} | D_{11} |
| D_{21} | D_{22} | D_{23} | D_{24} | D_{25} | D_{26} | D_{27} | D_{28} | D_{29} Calif. Hold | D_{30} Conn. Re-elected |
| D_{40} N.Y. Re-elected | D_{39} N.M. Re-elected | D_{38} N.J. Hold | D_{37} Nev. Re-elected | D_{36} Minn. Re-elected | D_{35} Mich. Hold | D_{34} Mass. Re-elected | D_{33} Md. Hold | D_{32} Hawaii; Re-elected | D_{31} Del. Hold |
| D_{41} R.I. Re-elected | D_{42} Va. Re-elected | D_{43} Wash. Re-elected | D_{44} Wisc. Re-elected | D_{45} Ariz. Gain | I_{1} Maine; Re-elected | I_{2} Vt. Re-elected | R_{53} W.Va. Gain | R_{52} Pa. Gain | R_{51} Ohio; Gain |
| Majority → | | | | | | | | | R_{51} Ohio; Gain |
| R_{41} Miss. Re-elected | R_{42} Mo. Re-elected | R_{43} Neb. (reg); Re-elected | R_{44} Neb. (sp); Elected (Note: Appointee elected) | R_{45} N.D. Re-elected | R_{46} Tenn. Re-elected | R_{47} Texas; Re-elected | R_{48} Utah; Hold | R_{49} Wyo. Re-elected | R_{50} Mont. Gain |
| R_{40} Ind. Hold | R_{39} Fla. Re-elected | R_{38} | R_{37} | R_{36} | R_{35} | R_{34} | R_{33} | R_{32} | R_{31} |
| R_{21} | R_{22} | R_{23} | R_{24} | R_{25} | R_{26} | R_{27} | R_{28} | R_{29} | R_{30} |
| R_{20} | R_{19} | R_{18} | R_{17} | R_{16} | R_{15} | R_{14} | R_{13} | R_{12} | R_{11} |
| R_{1} | R_{2} | R_{3} | R_{4} | R_{5} | R_{6} | R_{7} | R_{8} | R_{9} | R_{10} |

Key

| D_{#} | Democratic |
| R_{#} | Republican |
| I_{#} | Independent, caucusing with Democrats |

== Final pre-election predictions ==
Several sites and individuals published predictions of competitive seats. These predictions looked at factors such as the strength of the incumbent (if the incumbent was running for reelection) and the other candidates, and the state's partisan lean (reflected in part by the state's Cook Partisan Voting Index rating). The predictions assigned ratings to each seat, indicating the predicted advantage that a party had in winning that seat. Most election predictors used:

- "tossup": no advantage
- "tilt" (used by some predictors): advantage that is not quite as strong as "lean"
- "lean" or "leans": slight advantage
- "likely": significant, but surmountable, advantage
- "safe" or "solid": near-certain chance of victory

| Constituency | | Incumbent | | Ratings | | | | | | | | |
| State | PVI | Senator | Last election (Note: The last elections for this group of senators were in 2018, except for those elected in a special election or who were appointed after the resignation or death of a sitting senator, as noted.) | Cook Oct. 21, 2024 | IE Oct. 31, 2024 | Sabato Nov. 4, 2024 | RCP Oct. 30, 2024 | ED Nov. 4, 2024 | DDHQ/The Hill Nov. 5, 2024 | Fox Oct. 29, 2024 | 538 Nov. 2, 2024 | Result |
|---|---|---|---|---|---|---|---|---|---|---|---|---|
| Arizona | R+2 | Kyrsten Sinema (retiring) | 49.96% D (Note: Sinema was elected as a Democrat, and switched to being an independent in December 2022.) | Lean D (flip) | Lean D (flip) | Lean D (flip) | Tossup | Likely D (flip) | Lean D (flip) | Lean D (flip) | Likely D (flip) | Gallego; 50.06% D (flip) |
| California | D+13 | Laphonza Butler (retiring) | Appointed (2023) (Note: Democrat Dianne Feinstein won with 54.2% of the vote in 2018 against a fellow Democrat, but died in office on September 29, 2023.) | Solid D | Solid D | Safe D | Solid D | Safe D | Safe D | Solid D | Solid D | Schiff; 58.87% D |
| Connecticut | D+7 | Chris Murphy | 59.53% D | Solid D | Solid D | Safe D | Solid D | Safe D | Safe D | Solid D | Solid D | Murphy; 58.58% D |
| Delaware | D+7 | Tom Carper (retiring) | 59.95% D | Solid D | Solid D | Safe D | Solid D | Safe D | Safe D | Solid D | Solid D | Blunt Rochester; 56.59% D |
| Florida | R+3 | Rick Scott | 50.05% R | Likely R | Likely R | Likely R | Lean R | Likely R | Lean R | Likely R | Likely R | Scott; 55.57% R |
| Hawaii | D+14 | Mazie Hirono | 71.15% D | Solid D | Solid D | Safe D | Solid D | Safe D | Safe D | Solid D | Solid D | Hirono; 64.61% D |
| Indiana | R+11 | Mike Braun (retiring) | 50.73% R | Solid R | Solid R | Safe R | Solid R | Safe R | Safe R | Solid R | Solid R | Banks; 58.64% R |
| Maine | D+2 | Angus King | 54.31% I | Solid I | Solid I | Safe I | Solid I | Safe I | Safe I | Solid I | Likely I | King; 52.06% I |
| Maryland | D+14 | Ben Cardin (retiring) | 64.86% D | Likely D | Likely D | Likely D | Lean D | Safe D | Safe D | Lean D | Solid D | Alsobrooks; 54.64% D |
| Massachusetts | D+15 | Elizabeth Warren | 60.34% D | Solid D | Solid D | Safe D | Solid D | Safe D | Safe D | Solid D | Solid D | Warren; 59.81% D |
| Michigan | R+1 | Debbie Stabenow (retiring) | 52.26% D | Tossup | Tilt D | Lean D | Tossup | Lean D | Lean D | Tossup | Likely D | Slotkin; 48.64% D |
| Minnesota | D+1 | Amy Klobuchar | 60.31% D | Solid D | Solid D | Safe D | Solid D | Safe D | Safe D | Solid D | Solid D | Klobuchar; 56.20% D |
| Mississippi | R+11 | Roger Wicker | 58.49% R | Solid R | Solid R | Safe R | Solid R | Safe R | Safe R | Solid R | Solid R | Wicker; 62.81% R |
| Missouri | R+10 | Josh Hawley | 51.38% R | Solid R | Solid R | Safe R | Likely R | Safe R | Likely R | Solid R | Solid R | Hawley; 55.58% R |
| Montana | R+11 | Jon Tester | 50.33% D | Lean R (flip) | Tilt R (flip) | Lean R (flip) | Lean R (flip) | Lean R (flip) | Likely R (flip) | Lean R (flip) | Likely R (flip) | Sheehy; 52.64% R (flip) |
| Nebraska (regular) | R+13 | Deb Fischer | 57.69% R | Lean R | Lean R | Lean R | Lean R | Likely R | Likely R | Lean R | Likely R | Fischer; 53.19% R |
| Nebraska (special) | R+13 | Pete Ricketts | Appointed (2023) (Note: Republican Ben Sasse won with 62.7% of the vote in 2020, but resigned January 8, 2023, to become president of the University of Florida.) | Solid R | Solid R | Safe R | Solid R | Safe R | Safe R | Solid R | Solid R | Ricketts; 62.64% R |
| Nevada | R+1 | Jacky Rosen | 50.41% D | Lean D | Lean D | Lean D | Tossup | Likely D | Lean D | Lean D | Likely D | Rosen; 47.87% D |
| New Jersey | D+6 | George Helmy (retiring) | Appointed (2024) (Note: Democrat Bob Menendez won with 54.0% of the vote in 2018, but resigned August 20, 2024, due to criminal convictions.) | Solid D | Solid D | Safe D | Likely D | Safe D | Safe D | Solid D | Likely D | Kim; 53.61% D |
| New Mexico | D+3 | Martin Heinrich | 54.09% D | Solid D | Solid D | Safe D | Lean D | Safe D | Likely D | Likely D | Solid D | Heinrich; 55.06% D |
| New York | D+10 | Kirsten Gillibrand | 67.00% D | Solid D | Solid D | Safe D | Solid D | Safe D | Safe D | Solid D | Solid D | Gillibrand; 58.91% D |
| North Dakota | R+20 | Kevin Cramer | 55.45% R | Solid R | Solid R | Safe R | Solid R | Safe R | Safe R | Solid R | Solid R | Cramer; 66.31% R |
| Ohio | R+6 | Sherrod Brown | 53.41% D | Tossup | Tossup | Lean R (flip) | Tossup | Lean D | Tossup | Tossup | Tossup | Moreno; 50.09% R (flip) |
| Pennsylvania | R+2 | Bob Casey Jr. | 55.74% D | Tossup | Tilt D | Lean D | Tossup | Lean D | Tossup | Tossup | Lean D | McCormick; 48.82% R (flip) |
| Rhode Island | D+8 | Sheldon Whitehouse | 61.44% D | Solid D | Solid D | Safe D | Solid D | Safe D | Safe D | Solid D | Solid D | Whitehouse; 59.90% D |
| Tennessee | R+14 | Marsha Blackburn | 54.71% R | Solid R | Solid R | Safe R | Solid R | Safe R | Safe R | Solid R | Solid R | Blackburn; 63.80% R |
| Texas | R+5 | Ted Cruz | 50.89% R | Lean R | Tilt R | Lean R | Tossup | Lean R | Lean R | Likely R | Likely R | Cruz; 53.07% R |
| Utah | R+13 | Mitt Romney (retiring) | 62.59% R | Solid R | Solid R | Safe R | Solid R | Safe R | Safe R | Solid R | Solid R | Curtis; 62.50% R |
| Vermont | D+16 | Bernie Sanders | 67.44% I | Solid I | Solid I | Safe I | Solid I | Safe I | Safe I | Solid I | Solid I | Sanders; 63.16% I |
| Virginia | D+3 | Tim Kaine | 57.00% D | Solid D | Solid D | Safe D | Likely D | Safe D | Likely D | Solid D | Likely D | Kaine; 54.37% D |
| Washington | D+8 | Maria Cantwell | 58.43% D | Solid D | Solid D | Safe D | Solid D | Safe D | Safe D | Solid D | Solid D | Cantwell; 59.09% D |
| West Virginia | R+22 | Joe Manchin (retiring) | 49.57% D (Note: Manchin was elected as a Democrat, and switched to being an independent in May 2024.) | Solid R (flip) | Solid R (flip) | Safe R (flip) | Solid R (flip) | Safe R (flip) | Safe R (flip) | Solid R (flip) | Solid R (flip) | Justice; 68.75% R (flip) |
| Wisconsin | R+2 | Tammy Baldwin | 55.36% D | Tossup | Tilt D | Lean D | Tossup | Lean D | Tossup | Tossup | Lean D | Baldwin; 49.33% D |
| Wyoming | R+25 | John Barrasso | 66.96% R | Solid R | Solid R | Safe R | Solid R | Safe R | Safe R | Solid R | Solid R | Barrasso; 75.11% R |
| Overall (Note: Democratic total includes Independents who caucus with the Democrats.) | | | | D/I - 45; R - 51; 4 tossups | D/I - 48; R - 51; 1 tossup | D/I - 48; R - 52; 0 tossups | D/I - 43; R - 50; 7 tossups | D/I - 49; R - 51; 0 tossups | D/I - 46; R - 51; 3 tossups | D/I - 45; R - 51; 4 tossups | D/I - 48; R - 51; 1 tossup | Results: D/I - 47; R - 53 |

== Gains and holds ==
=== Retirements ===
Map of retirements: Republican incumbent Democratic incumbent Independent incumbent Republican incumbent retiring Democratic incumbent retiring Independent incumbent retiring

Two Independents, two Republicans and five Democrats retired instead of seeking re-election. Senator Dianne Feinstein had previously announced her intent to retire at the end of her term; however, she died in office on September 29, 2023.

| State | Senator | Age at end of term | Assumed office | Replaced by | Ref |
|---|---|---|---|---|---|
| Arizona | Kyrsten Sinema | 48 | 2019 | Ruben Gallego | |
| California | Laphonza Butler | 45 | 2023 (Note: Appointed to the seat following the death of Dianne Feinstein.) | Adam Schiff | |
| Delaware | Tom Carper | 77 | 2001 | Lisa Blunt Rochester | |
| Indiana | Mike Braun | 70 | 2019 | Jim Banks | |
| Maryland | Ben Cardin | 81 | 2007 | Angela Alsobrooks | |
| Michigan | Debbie Stabenow | 74 | 2001 | Elissa Slotkin | |
| New Jersey | George Helmy | 45 | 2024 (Note: Appointed to the seat following the resignation of Bob Menendez.) | Andy Kim | |
| Utah | Mitt Romney | 77 | 2019 | John Curtis | |
| West Virginia | Joe Manchin | 77 | 2010 (Note: Elected in the special election to finish Robert Byrd's term.) | Jim Justice | |

=== Defeats ===
Three Democrats sought re-election but lost in the general election.

| State | Senator | Age at end of term | Assumed office | Replaced by |
|---|---|---|---|---|
| Montana | Jon Tester | 68 | 2007 | Tim Sheehy |
| Ohio | Sherrod Brown | 72 | 2007 | Bernie Moreno |
| Pennsylvania | Bob Casey Jr. | 64 | 2007 | Dave McCormick |

=== Post-election changes ===
Two Republicans resigned shortly after the start of the 119th Congress, and another Republican resigned during the 119th Congress. One Republican died during the 119th Congress. All were replaced by Republican appointees. In Florida, the 2026 special election was held prior to the 2028 Senate elections for the remainder of the Class 3 term, where Republican appointee Ashley Moody won the special election to finish the term. In Ohio, the 2026 special election was also held prior to the 2028 Senate elections for the remainder of the Class 3 term, where Sherrod Brown won the special election to succeed Republican appointee Jon Husted, who lost election to finish the term. In Oklahoma, a regular scheduled election was held in the 2026 Senate elections for the Class 2 terms, where Kevin Hern won the election to succeed Republican appointee Alan Armstrong, who could not seek election to a full term. In South Carolina, a regular scheduled election was also held in the 2026 Senate elections for the Class 2 terms, where Annie Andrews won the election to succeed Republican appointee Darline Graham, who lost election to a full term.

| State | Senator | Replaced by |
|---|---|---|
| Ohio (Class 3) | JD Vance | Jon Husted |
| Florida (Class 3) | Marco Rubio | Ashley Moody |
| Oklahoma (Class 2) | Markwayne Mullin | Alan Armstrong |
| South Carolina (Class 2) | Lindsey Graham | Darline Graham |
| Oklahoma (Class 2) | Alan Armstrong | Kevin Hern |
| Ohio (Class 3) | Jon Husted | Sherrod Brown |

== Race summary ==
=== Special elections during the preceding Congress ===
In each special election, the winner's term begins immediately after their election is certified by their state's government.

Elections are sorted by date, then state.

| State | Incumbent | | | Status | Candidates |
| State | Senator | Party | Electoral history | Status | Candidates |
|---|---|---|---|---|---|
| California (Class 1) | Laphonza Butler | Democratic | 2023 (appointed) | Interim appointee retired. Democratic hold. Winner also elected to the next term; see below. | ▌ ✓ Adam Schiff (Democratic) 58.8%; ▌Steve Garvey (Republican) 41.2% |
| Nebraska (Class 2) | Pete Ricketts | Republican | 2023 (appointed) | Interim appointee elected. | ▌ ✓ Pete Ricketts (Republican) 62.6%; ▌Preston Love Jr. (Democratic) 37.4% |

=== Elections leading to the next Congress ===
In these general elections, the winners were elected for the term beginning January 3, 2025.

| State | Incumbent | | | | Candidates |
| State | Senator | Party | Electoral history | Result | Candidates |
|---|---|---|---|---|---|
| Arizona | Kyrsten Sinema | Independent | 2018 | Incumbent retired. Democratic gain. | ▌ ✓ Ruben Gallego (Democratic) 50.1%; ▌Kari Lake (Republican) 47.7%; ▌Eduardo Heredia-Quintana (Green) 2.3% |
| California | Laphonza Butler | Democratic | 2023 (appointed) | Interim appointee retired. Democratic hold. Winner also elected to finish the term; see above. | ▌ ✓ Adam Schiff (Democratic) 58.9%; ▌Steve Garvey (Republican) 41.1% |
| Connecticut | Chris Murphy | Democratic | 2012; 2018 | Incumbent re-elected. | ▌ ✓ Chris Murphy (Democratic) 58.6%; ▌Matthew Corey (Republican) 39.8%; ▌Robert F. Hyde (Independent) 0.9%; ▌Justin Paglino (Green) 0.8% |
| Delaware | Tom Carper | Democratic | 2000; 2006; 2012; 2018 | Incumbent retired. Democratic hold. | ▌ ✓ Lisa Blunt Rochester (Democratic) 56.6%; ▌Eric Hansen (Republican) 39.5%; ▌Michael Katz (Independent Party) 3.9% |
| Florida | Rick Scott | Republican | 2018 | Incumbent re-elected. | ▌ ✓ Rick Scott (Republican) 55.6%; ▌Debbie Mucarsel-Powell (Democratic) 42.8%; Others: ▌Ben Everidge (Independent) 0.6%; ▌Feena Bonoan (Libertarian) 0.5%; ▌Tuan Nguyen (Independent) 0.5% |
| Hawaii | Mazie Hirono | Democratic | 2012; 2018 | Incumbent re-elected. | ▌ ✓ Mazie Hirono (Democratic) 64.6%; ▌Bob McDermott (Republican) 31.9%; Others: ▌Shelby Billionaire (We the People) 1.8%; ▌Emma Pohlman (Green) 1.7% |
| Indiana | Mike Braun | Republican | 2018 | Incumbent retired to run for governor. Republican hold. | ▌ ✓ Jim Banks (Republican) 58.6%; ▌Valerie McCray (Democratic) 38.8%; ▌Andy Horning (Libertarian) 2.6% |
| Maine | Angus King | Independent | 2012; 2018 | Incumbent re-elected. | ▌ ✓ Angus King (Independent) 52.1%; ▌Demitroula Kouzounas (Republican) 34.6%; ▌David Costello (Democratic) 10.8%; ▌Jason Cherry (Independent) 2.5% |
| Maryland | Ben Cardin | Democratic | 2006; 2012; 2018 | Incumbent retired. Democratic hold. | ▌ ✓ Angela Alsobrooks (Democratic) 54.6%; ▌Larry Hogan (Republican) 42.8%; ▌Mike Scott (Libertarian) 2.5% |
| Massachusetts | Elizabeth Warren | Democratic | 2012; 2018 | Incumbent re-elected. | ▌ ✓ Elizabeth Warren (Democratic) 59.8%; ▌John Deaton (Republican) 40.0% |
| Michigan | Debbie Stabenow | Democratic | 2000; 2006; 2012; 2018 | Incumbent retired. Democratic hold. | ▌ ✓ Elissa Slotkin (Democratic) 48.6%; ▌Mike Rogers (Republican) 48.3%; Others: ▌Joseph Solis-Mullen (Libertarian) 1.0%; ▌Douglas Marsh (Green) 1.0%; ▌Dave Stein (Constitution) 0.7%; ▌Doug Dern (Natural Law) 0.3% |
| Minnesota | Amy Klobuchar | DFL | 2006; 2012; 2018 | Incumbent re-elected. | ▌ ✓ Amy Klobuchar (DFL) 56.2%; ▌Royce White (Republican) 40.5%; Others: ▌Rebecca Whiting (Libertarian) 1.7%; ▌Joyce Lacey (Independence) 1.5% |
| Mississippi | Roger Wicker | Republican | 2007 (appointed); 2008 (special); 2012; 2018 | Incumbent re-elected. | ▌ ✓ Roger Wicker (Republican) 62.8%; ▌Ty Pinkins (Democratic) 36.6% |
| Missouri | Josh Hawley | Republican | 2018 | Incumbent re-elected. | ▌ ✓ Josh Hawley (Republican) 55.6%; ▌Lucas Kunce (Democratic) 41.8%; Others: ▌W. C. Young (Libertarian) 1.2%; ▌Jared Young (Independent) 0.7%; ▌Nathan Kline (Green) 0.7% |
| Montana | Jon Tester | Democratic | 2006; 2012; 2018 | Incumbent lost re-election. Republican gain. | ▌ ✓ Tim Sheehy (Republican) 52.6%; ▌Jon Tester (Democratic) 45.5%; Others: ▌Sid Daoud (Libertarian) 1.2%; ▌Michael Downey (Green) 0.7% |
| Nebraska | Deb Fischer | Republican | 2012; 2018 | Incumbent re-elected. | ▌ ✓ Deb Fischer (Republican) 53.2%; ▌Dan Osborn (Independent) 46.5% |
| Nevada | Jacky Rosen | Democratic | 2018 | Incumbent re-elected. | ▌ ✓ Jacky Rosen (Democratic) 47.9%; ▌Sam Brown (Republican) 46.2%; None of These Candidates 3.0%; Others: ▌Janine Hansen (Independent American) 1.5%; ▌Christopher Cunningham (Libertarian) 1.4% |
| New Jersey | George Helmy | Democratic | 2024 (appointed) | Interim appointee ineligible to run. Democratic hold. Interim appointee resigned December 8, 2024, to give Kim preferential seniority. Winner appointed the same day. | ▌ ✓ Andy Kim (Democratic) 53.6%; ▌Curtis Bashaw (Republican) 44.0%; Others: ▌Christina Khalil (Green) 1.1%; ▌Ken Kaplan (Libertarian) 0.6%; ▌Patricia Mooneyham (Independent) 0.4%; ▌Joanne Kuniansky (Socialist Workers) 0.2% |
| New Mexico | Martin Heinrich | Democratic | 2012; 2018 | Incumbent re-elected. | ▌ ✓ Martin Heinrich (Democratic) 55.1%; ▌Nella Domenici (Republican) 44.9% |
| New York | Kirsten Gillibrand | Democratic | 2009 (appointed); 2010 (special); 2012; 2018 | Incumbent re-elected. | ▌ ✓ Kirsten Gillibrand (Democratic) 58.5%; ▌Mike Sapraicone (Republican) 41.0%; ▌Diane Sare (LaRouche) 0.5% |
| North Dakota | Kevin Cramer | Republican | 2018 | Incumbent re-elected. | ▌ ✓ Kevin Cramer (Republican) 66.5%; ▌Katrina Christiansen (Democratic–NPL) 33.5% |
| Ohio | Sherrod Brown | Democratic | 2006; 2012; 2018 | Incumbent lost re-election. Republican gain. | ▌ ✓ Bernie Moreno (Republican) 50.1%; ▌Sherrod Brown (Democratic) 46.5%; ▌Don Kissick (Libertarian) 3.4% |
| Pennsylvania | Bob Casey Jr. | Democratic | 2006; 2012; 2018 | Incumbent lost re-election. Republican gain. | ▌ ✓ Dave McCormick (Republican) 48.8%; ▌Bob Casey Jr. (Democratic) 48.6%; Others: ▌John Thomas (Libertarian) 1.2%; ▌Leila Hazou (Green) 1.0%; ▌Marty Selker (Constitution) 0.3% |
| Rhode Island | Sheldon Whitehouse | Democratic | 2006; 2012; 2018 | Incumbent re-elected. | ▌ ✓ Sheldon Whitehouse (Democratic) 59.9%; ▌Patricia Morgan (Republican) 40.1% |
| Tennessee | Marsha Blackburn | Republican | 2018 | Incumbent re-elected. | ▌ ✓ Marsha Blackburn (Republican) 63.8%; ▌Gloria Johnson (Democratic) 34.2%; Others: ▌Tharon Chandler (Independent) 0.9%; ▌Pamela Moses (Independent) 0.8%; ▌Hastina Robinson (Independent) 0.3% |
| Texas | Ted Cruz | Republican | 2012; 2018 | Incumbent re-elected. | ▌ ✓ Ted Cruz (Republican) 53.1%; ▌Colin Allred (Democratic) 44.6%; ▌Ted Brown (Libertarian) 2.4% |
| Utah | Mitt Romney | Republican | 2018 | Incumbent retired. Republican hold. | ▌ ✓ John Curtis (Republican) 62.5%; ▌Caroline Gleich (Democratic) 31.7%; ▌Carlton Bowen (Independent American) 5.7% |
| Vermont | Bernie Sanders | Independent | 2006; 2012; 2018 | Incumbent re-elected. | ▌ ✓ Bernie Sanders (Independent) 63.2%; ▌Gerald Malloy (Republican) 32.1%; ▌Steve Berry (Independent) 2.2%; Others: ▌Matt Hill (Libertarian) 1.2%; ▌Justin Schoville (Peace and Justice) 0.9%; ▌Matt Stewart Greenstein (Independent) 0.3% |
| Virginia | Tim Kaine | Democratic | 2012; 2018 | Incumbent re-elected. | ▌ ✓ Tim Kaine (Democratic) 54.4%; ▌Hung Cao (Republican) 45.4% |
| Washington | Maria Cantwell | Democratic | 2000; 2006; 2012; 2018 | Incumbent re-elected. | ▌ ✓ Maria Cantwell (Democratic) 59.1%; ▌Raul Garcia (Republican) 40.6% |
| West Virginia | Joe Manchin | Independent | 2010 (special); 2012; 2018 | Incumbent retired. Republican gain. Winner delayed start of term until January 14, 2025, to finish his term as Governor of West Virginia. | ▌ ✓ Jim Justice (Republican) 68.8%; ▌Glenn Elliott (Democratic) 27.3%; ▌David Moran (Libertarian) 4.0% |
| Wisconsin | Tammy Baldwin | Democratic | 2012; 2018 | Incumbent re-elected. | ▌ ✓ Tammy Baldwin (Democratic) 49.3%; ▌Eric Hovde (Republican) 48.5%; Others: ▌Phil Anderson (Disrupt the Corruption) 1.2%; ▌Thomas Leager (America First) 0.9% |
| Wyoming | John Barrasso | Republican | 2007 (appointed); 2008 (special); 2012; 2018 | Incumbent re-elected. | ▌ ✓ John Barrasso (Republican) 75.1%; ▌Scott Morrow (Democratic) 24.1% |

== Closest races ==
11 races had a margin of victory under 10%:

| State | Party of winner | Margin |
|---|---|---|
| Pennsylvania | Republican (flip) | 0.22% |
| Michigan | Democratic | 0.34% |
| Wisconsin | Democratic | 0.85% |
| Nevada | Democratic | 1.64% |
| Arizona | Democratic (flip) | 2.41% |
| Ohio | Republican (flip) | 3.62% |
| Nebraska | Republican | 6.67% |
| Montana | Republican (flip) | 7.14% (Note: Montana was the "tipping-point state".) |
| Texas | Republican | 8.50% |
| Virginia | Democratic | 8.93% |
| New Jersey | Democratic | 9.62% |

== Arizona ==
Arizona election
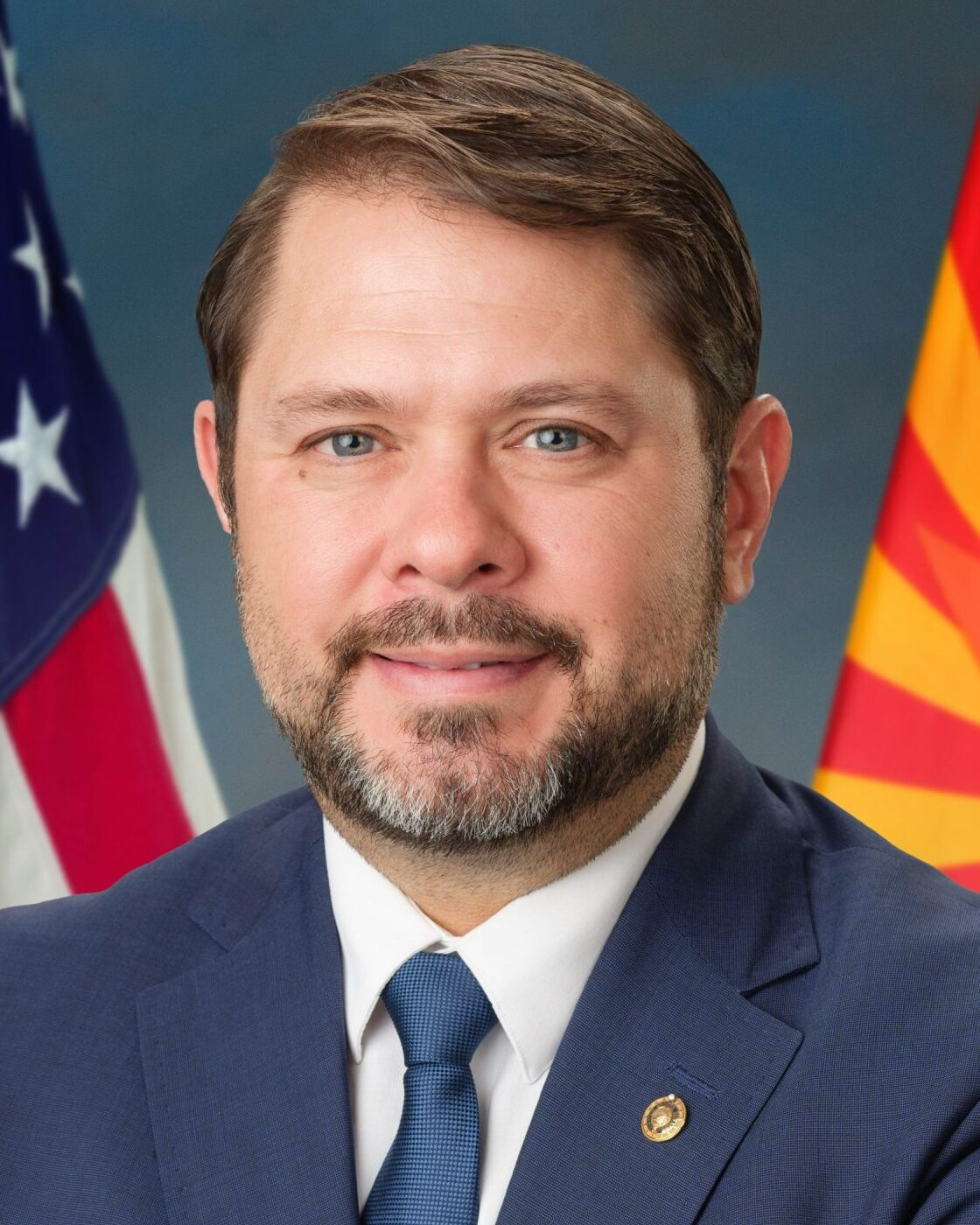

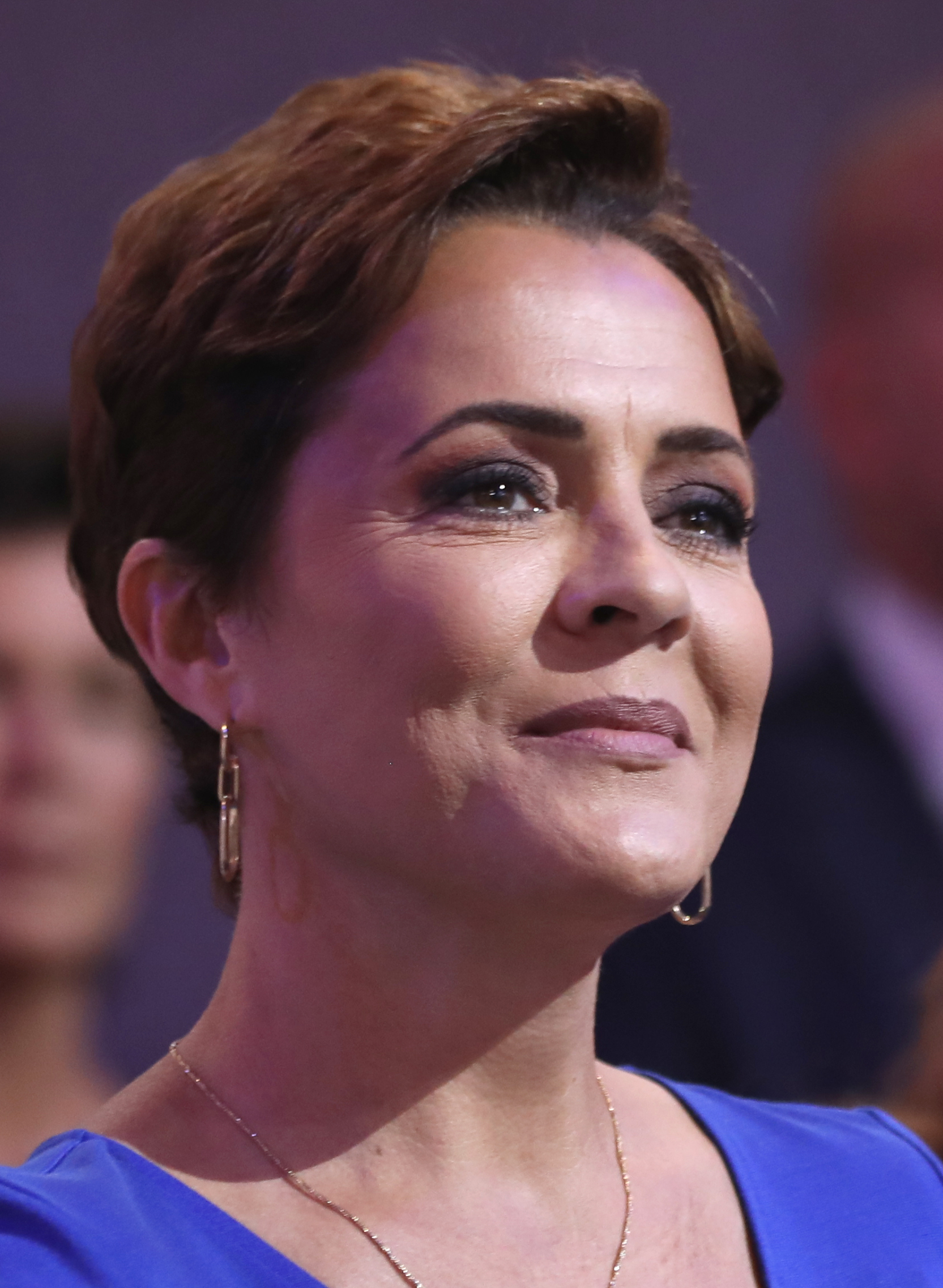
| Nominee | Ruben Gallego | Kari Lake |
| Party | Democratic | Republican |
| Popular vote | 1,676,335 | 1,595,761 |
| Percentage | 50.06% | 47.65% |
- County results Gallego: 50–60% 60–70% Lake: 50–60% 60–70% 70–80%
U.S. senator before election
Kyrsten Sinema
Independent
Elected U.S. senator
Ruben Gallego
Democratic

One-term independent Kyrsten Sinema was narrowly elected in 2018 as a Democrat with 50.0% of the vote. She left the Democratic Party in December 2022. Sinema announced on March 5, 2024, that she would not run for reelection. Prior to her retirement announcement, Sinema was considered vulnerable to challengers from the Democratic Party due to her opposition to some of President Joe Biden's agenda, and U.S. representative Ruben Gallego launched an early bid for the Democratic nomination, which he won with no opposition. Pinal County sheriff Mark Lamb and 2022 gubernatorial nominee Kari Lake sought the Republican nomination for U.S. Senate. Lake won the Republican primary by less than expected.

Republican primary results
| Party | Candidate | Votes | % |
|---|---|---|---|
| Republican | Kari Lake | 409,339 | 55.28% |
| Republican | Mark Lamb | 292,888 | 39.56% |
| Republican | Elizabeth Jean Reye | 38,208 | 5.16% |
| Total votes | | 740,435 | 100.0% |

2024 United States Senate election in Arizona
| Party | Candidate | Votes | % | ±% |
|---|---|---|---|---|
| Democratic | Ruben Gallego | 1,676,335 | 50.06% | +0.10% |
| Republican | Kari Lake | 1,595,761 | 47.65% | +0.04% |
| Green | Eduardo Heredia Quintana | 75,868 | 2.27% | –0.14% |
| Write-in | | 850 | 0.03% | – |
| Total votes | | 3,348,814 | 100.0% | N/A |
| Democratic gain from Independent | | | | |

== California ==
California election
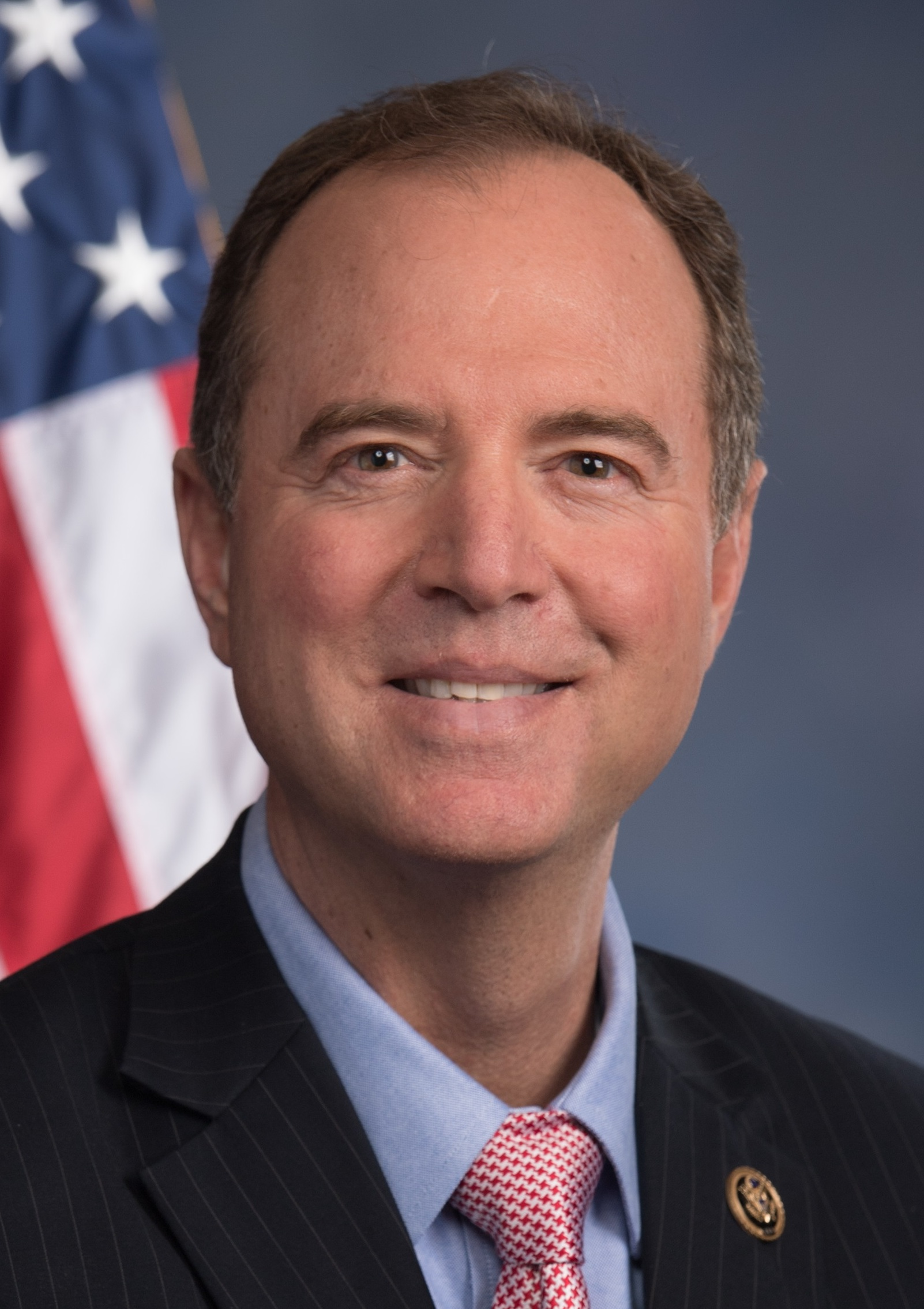

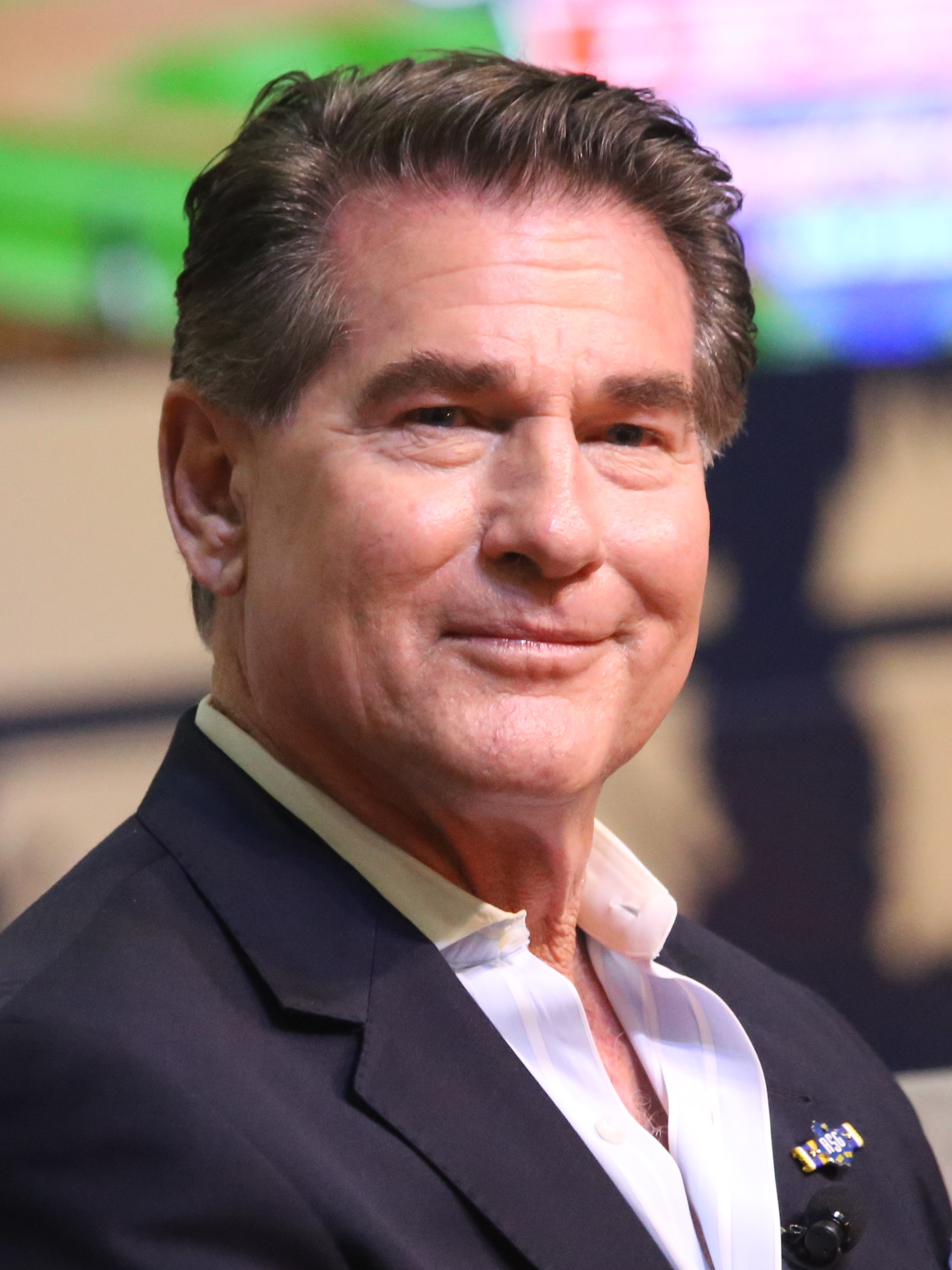
| Candidate | Adam Schiff | Steve Garvey |
| Party | Democratic | Republican |
| Regular election | 9,036,252; 58.87% | 6,312,594; 41.13% |
| Special election | 8,837,051; 58.75% | 6,204,637; 41.25% |
- Schiff: 50–60% 60–70% 70–80% 80–90% Garvey: 50–60% 60–70% 70–80%
U.S. senator before election
Laphonza Butler (Note: In October 2023, Butler was appointed by Governor Gavin Newsom to fill the vacancy caused by the death of Senator Dianne Feinstein.)
Democratic
Elected U.S. senator
Adam Schiff
Democratic

Five-term Democrat Dianne Feinstein was reelected in 2018 with 54.2% of the vote against another Democrat. On February 14, 2023, Feinstein announced that she would not seek reelection to a sixth term. However, she died on September 29, 2023, leaving the seat vacant. Democrat Laphonza Butler, president of EMILY's List, was appointed by California governor Gavin Newsom to succeed Feinstein on October 2, 2023. Butler did not run for election to a full term, or for the final two months of the current term.

There were three major Democratic candidates for the seat — U.S. representatives Barbara Lee, Katie Porter, and Adam Schiff — along with former professional baseball player Steve Garvey running as a Republican. Schiff was viewed as representing the establishment wing of the Democratic Party, while Porter and Lee represent the progressive wing.

Schiff and Garvey won the nonpartisan primary election which took place on March 5, 2024, during Super Tuesday, setting up a general election campaign between the two. Schiff narrowly secured the first place in the regular primary with just 0.05% of the vote over Garvey, but fell short of it in the special one by 4%. However, the three leading Democrats overall performed better in the special primary, with 58.2% of the vote compared to 56.7%. Due to California's election rules, similar to the previous election for the other seat, there were two ballot items for the same seat: a general election, to elect a Class 1 senator to a full term beginning with the 119th United States Congress, to be sworn in on January 3, 2025; and a special election, to fill that seat for the final weeks of the 118th Congress.

Schiff was considered a heavy favorite, and easily won both the regular and special general elections with more than 58% of the vote. Schiff became the first male U.S. senator from this seat since John Seymour left office in 1992 and California one of several states to have a younger senior senator (Alex Padilla) and an older junior senator (Schiff). With over 41% of the vote in the general election, Garvey had the best performance of any Republican candidate for this seat since 1994. Garvey managed to win Orange County, which voted for Kamala Harris in the concurrent presidential election. He also flipped three counties compared to the 2022 Senate election: Lake, Imperial, and San Joaquin counties. With over 6.3 million votes in the regular election, Garvey set the record for the most votes ever received by a Republican candidate in a single state for any election, as Donald Trump was the runner up with 200,000 fewer votes in the concurrent presidential election.

Special blanket primary results
| Party | Candidate | Votes | % |
|---|---|---|---|
| Republican | Steve Garvey | 2,455,115 | 33.25% |
| Democratic | Adam Schiff | 2,160,171 | 29.25% |
| Democratic | Katie Porter | 1,272,684 | 17.24% |
| Democratic | Barbara Lee | 866,551 | 11.74% |
| Republican | Eric Early | 451,274 | 6.11% |
| Democratic | Christina Pascucci | 109,867 | 1.49% |
| Democratic | Sepi Gilani | 68,497 | 0.93% |
| No party preference | Michael Dilger (write-in) | 27 | 0.00% |
| Total votes | | 7,384,186 | 100.0% |

Regular blanket primary results
| Party | Candidate | Votes | % |
|---|---|---|---|
| Democratic | Adam Schiff | 2,304,829 | 31.57% |
| Republican | Steve Garvey | 2,301,351 | 31.52% |
| Democratic | Katie Porter | 1,118,429 | 15.32% |
| Democratic | Barbara Lee | 717,129 | 9.82% |
| Republican | Eric Early | 242,055 | 3.32% |
| Republican | James Bradley | 98,778 | 1.35% |
| Democratic | Christina Pascucci | 61,998 | 0.85% |
| Republican | Sharleta Bassett | 54,884 | 0.75% |
| Republican | Sarah Sun Liew | 38,718 | 0.53% |
| No party preference | Laura Garza | 34,529 | 0.47% |
| Republican | Jonathan Reiss | 34,400 | 0.47% |
| Democratic | Sepi Gilani | 34,316 | 0.47% |
| Libertarian | Gail Lightfoot | 33,295 | 0.46% |
| Republican | Denice Gary-Pandol | 25,649 | 0.35% |
| Republican | James Macauley | 23,296 | 0.32% |
| Democratic | Harmesh Kumar | 21,624 | 0.30% |
| Democratic | David Peterson | 21,170 | 0.29% |
| Democratic | Douglas Pierce | 19,458 | 0.27% |
| No party preference | Major Singh | 17,092 | 0.23% |
| Democratic | John Rose | 14,627 | 0.20% |
| Democratic | Perry Pound | 14,195 | 0.19% |
| Democratic | Raji Rab | 13,640 | 0.19% |
| No party preference | Mark Ruzon | 13,488 | 0.18% |
| American Independent | Forrest Jones | 13,140 | 0.18% |
| Republican | Stefan Simchowitz | 12,773 | 0.17% |
| Republican | Martin Veprauskas | 9,795 | 0.13% |
| No party preference | Don Grundmann | 6,641 | 0.09% |
| No party preference | Michael Dilger (write-in) | 7 | 0.00% |
| Republican | Carlos Guillermo Tapia (write-in) | 5 | 0.00% |
| No party preference | John Dowell (write-in) | 3 | 0.00% |
| Republican | Danny Fabricant (write-in) | 3 | 0.00% |
| Total votes | | 7,301,317 | 100.0% |

2024 United States Senate special election in California
| Party | Candidate | Votes | % | ±% |
|---|---|---|---|---|
| Democratic | Adam Schiff | 8,837,051 | 58.75% | N/A |
| Republican | Steve Garvey | 6,204,637 | 41.25% | N/A |
| Total votes | | 15,041,688 | 100.00% | N/A |
| Democratic hold | | | | |

2024 United States Senate election in California
| Party | Candidate | Votes | % | ±% |
|---|---|---|---|---|
| Democratic | Adam Schiff | 9,036,252 | 58.87% | +0.12% |
| Republican | Steve Garvey | 6,312,594 | 41.13% | –0.12% |
| Total votes | | 15,348,846 | 100.00% | N/A |
| Democratic hold | | | | |

== Connecticut ==
Connecticut election
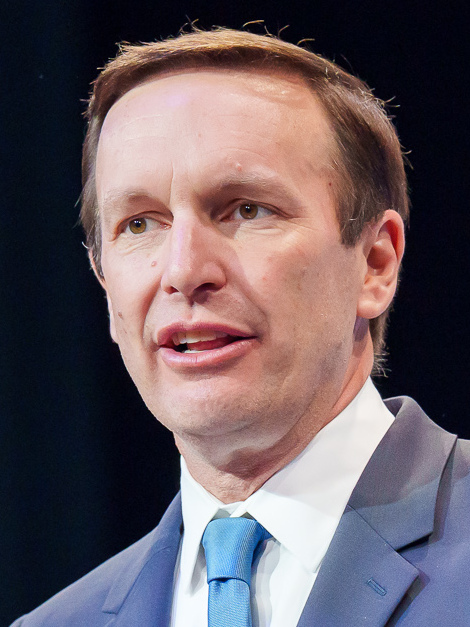
| Nominee | Chris Murphy | Matthew Corey |
| Party | Democratic | Republican |
| Popular vote | 1,000,695 | 678,256 |
| Percentage | 58.58% | 39.78% |
- Murphy: 40–50% 50–60% 60–70% 70–80% 80–90% Corey: 40–50% 50–60% 60–70%
U.S. senator before election
Chris Murphy
Democratic
Elected U.S. Senator
Chris Murphy
Democratic

Two-term Democrat Chris Murphy was reelected in 2018 with 59.5% of the vote. He announced that he was running for a third term. Beacon Falls First Selectman Gerry Smith announced his campaign in early February 2024. The Republican primary was won by tavern owner Matthew Corey, who was the Republican nominee in 2018.

Republican primary results
| Party | Candidate | Votes | % |
|---|---|---|---|
| Republican | Matthew Corey | 19,228 | 54.74% |
| Republican | Gerry Smith | 15,900 | 45.26% |
| Total votes | | 35,128 | 100.00% |

2024 United States Senate election in Connecticut
| Party | Candidate | Votes | % | ±% |
|---|---|---|---|---|
| Democratic | Chris Murphy | 953,646 | 55.83 | ▼0.97 |
| Working Families | Chris Murphy | 47,049 | 2.75 | ▲0.02 |
| Total | Chris Murphy (incumbent) | 1,000,695 | 58.58 | ▼0.95 |
| Republican | Matthew Corey | 678,256 | 39.70 | ▲0.35 |
| Cheaper Gas Groceries | Robert F. Hyde | 14,879 | 0.87 | N/A |
| Green | Justin Paglino | 14,422 | 0.84 | ▲0.36 |
| Write-in | | 7 | 0.00 | Steady |
| Total votes | | 1,708,259 | 100.00 | N/A |
| Democratic hold | | | | |

== Delaware ==
Delaware election
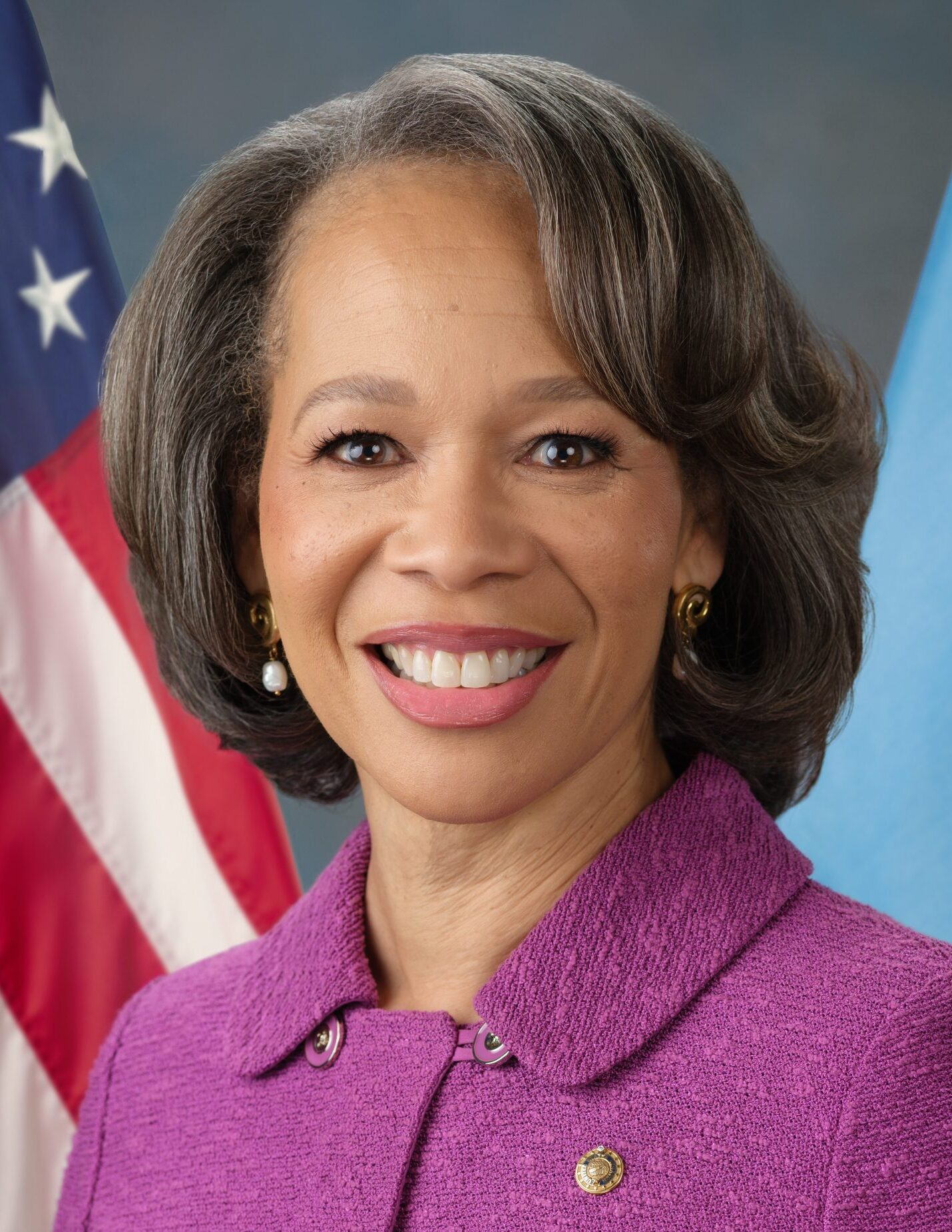

| Nominee | Lisa Blunt Rochester | Eric Hansen |
| Party | Democratic | Republican |
| Popular vote | 283,298 | 197,753 |
| Percentage | 56.59% | 39.5% |
- County results Blunt Rochester: 50–60% 60–70% Hansen: 50–60%
U.S. senator before election
Tom Carper
Democratic
Elected U.S. Senator
Lisa Blunt Rochester
Democratic

Four-term Democrat Tom Carper was reelected in 2018 with 60.0% of the vote. He announced on May 22, 2023, that he would be retiring, and would not run for a fifth term. Delaware's at-large U.S. representative Lisa Blunt Rochester ran for the Democratic nomination to succeed Carper, who endorsed her when he announced his retirement. Term-limited governor John Carney was also considered a possible Democratic candidate. Eric Hanson ran for the Republican nomination.

Both Blunt Rochester and Hansen won their primaries unopposed. In the general election, Blunt Rochester defeated Hansen by a 14-point margin.

United States Senate election in Delaware, 2024
| Party | Candidate | Votes | % | ±% |
|---|---|---|---|---|
| Democratic | Lisa Blunt Rochester | 283,298 | 56.59% | −3.36% |
| Republican | Eric Hansen | 197,753 | 39.50% | +1.69% |
| Independent Party | Michael Katz | 19,555 | 3.91% | N/A |
| Total votes | | 500,606 | 100.00% | N/A |
| Democratic hold | | | | |

== Florida ==
Florida election
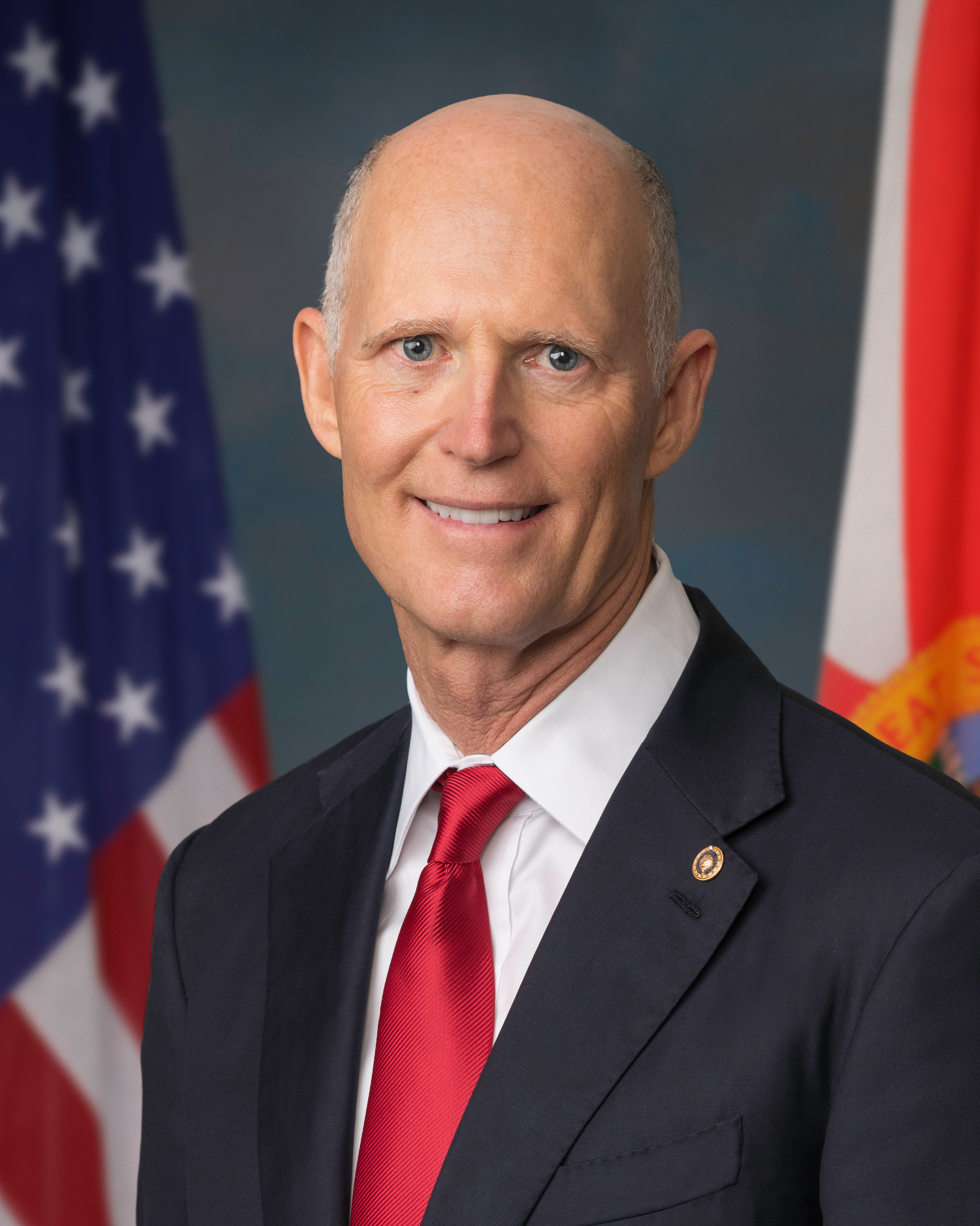

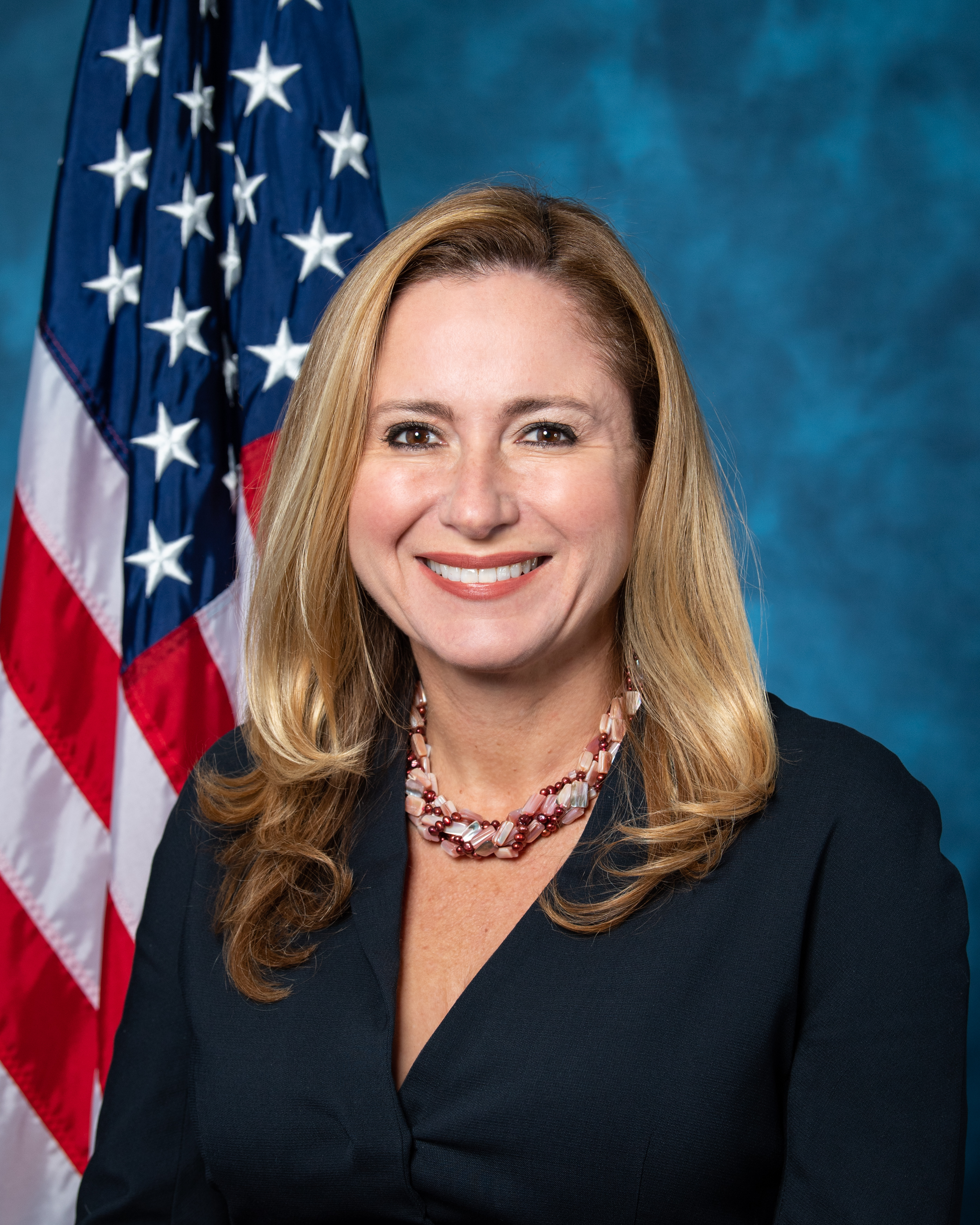
| Nominee | Rick Scott | Debbie Mucarsel-Powell |
| Party | Republican | Democratic |
| Popular vote | 5,977,706 | 4,603,077 |
| Percentage | 55.57% | 42.79% |
- County results Scott: 40–50% 50–60% 60–70% 70–80% 80–90% Mucarsel-Powell: 50–60% 60–70%
U.S. senator before election
Rick Scott
Republican
Elected U.S. senator
Rick Scott
Republican

Former governor and incumbent one-term Republican Rick Scott was narrowly elected in 2018 with 50.06% of the vote. He ran for reelection to a second term. Brevard County assistant district attorney Keith Gross and actor John Columbus challenged Scott for the Republican nomination.

Scott won a second term, defeating Democratic former congresswoman Debbie Mucarsel-Powell. With the benefit of incumbency and the state's rightward trend, most political pundits considered the race to be favoring Scott to win re-election. On Election Day, Scott won by 12.78 percentage points, a significantly larger margin than most pre-election polls had suggested.

Republican primary results
| Party | Candidate | Votes | % |
|---|---|---|---|
| Republican | Rick Scott (incumbent) | 1,283,904 | 84.38% |
| Republican | Keith Gross | 142,392 | 9.36% |
| Republican | John Columbus | 95,342 | 6.26% |
| Total votes | | 1,521,638 | 100.0% |

Democratic primary results
| Party | Candidate | Votes | % |
|---|---|---|---|
| Democratic | Debbie Mucarsel-Powell | 747,397 | 68.50% |
| Democratic | Stanley Campbell | 213,777 | 19.59% |
| Democratic | Brian Rush | 73,013 | 6.69% |
| Democratic | Rod Joseph | 56,961 | 5.22% |
| Total votes | | 1,091,148 | 100.0% |

2024 United States Senate election in Florida
| Party | Candidate | Votes | % | ±% |
|---|---|---|---|---|
| Republican | Rick Scott (incumbent) | 5,977,706 | 55.57% | +5.52% |
| Democratic | Debbie Mucarsel-Powell | 4,603,077 | 42.79% | −7.14% |
| Independent | Ben Everidge | 62,683 | 0.58% | N/A |
| Libertarian | Feena Bonoan | 57,363 | 0.53% | N/A |
| Independent | Tuan TQ Nguyen | 56,586 | 0.53% | N/A |
| Write-in | | 13 | 0.00% | -0.01% |
| Total votes | | 10,757,428 | 100.00% | N/A |
| Republican hold | | | | |

== Hawaii ==
Hawaii election
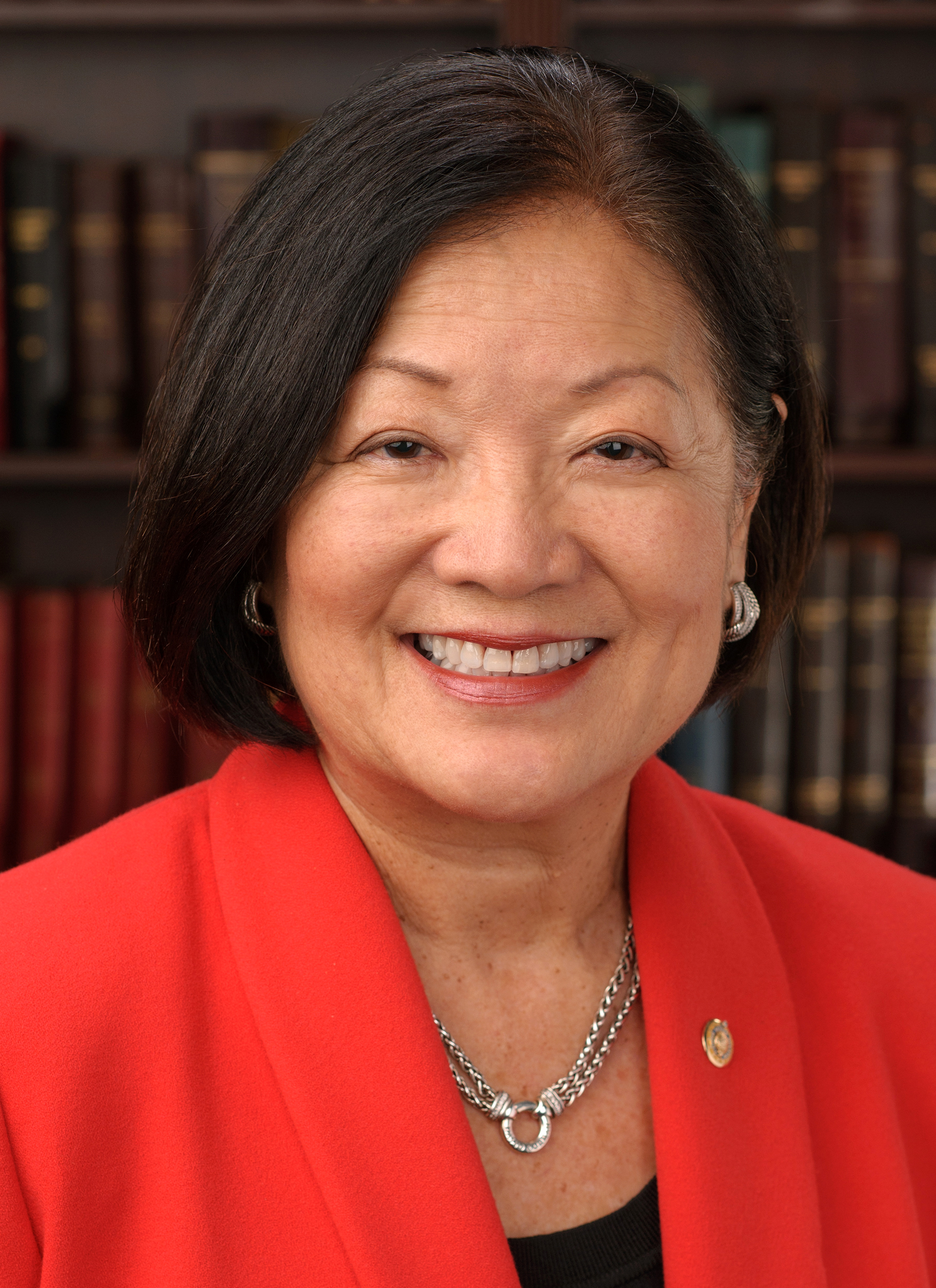

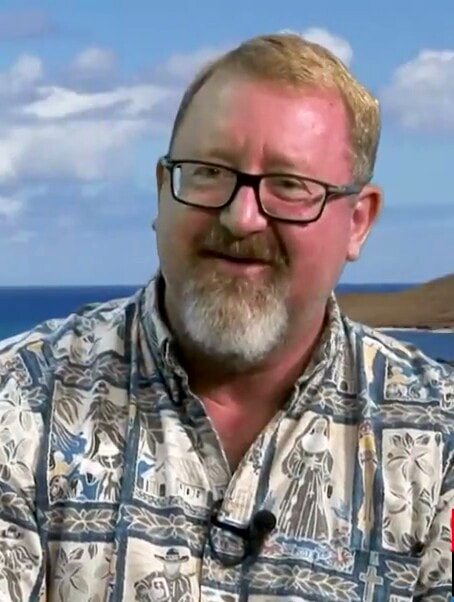
| Nominee | Mazie Hirono | Bob McDermott |
| Party | Democratic | Republican |
| Popular vote | 324,194 | 160,075 |
| Percentage | 64.61% | 31.90% |
- County results Hirono: 60–70%
U.S. senator before election
Mazie Hirono
Democratic
Elected U.S. Senator
Mazie Hirono
Democratic

Two-term Democrat Mazie Hirono was reelected in 2018 with 71.2% of the vote. Hirono ran for a third term. Former state representative Bob McDermott won a 6-candidate race to be the Republican nominee.

Democratic primary results
| Party | Candidate | Votes | % |
|---|---|---|---|
| Democratic | Mazie Hirono (incumbent) | 176,131 | 90.47% |
| Democratic | Ron Curtis | 14,271 | 7.33% |
| Democratic | Clyde Lewman | 4,287 | 2.2% |
| Total votes | | 194,689 | 100.0% |

Republican primary results
| Party | Candidate | Votes | % |
|---|---|---|---|
| Republican | Bob McDermott | 27,961 | 51.87% |
| Republican | Adriel Lam | 8,913 | 16.54% |
| Republican | Melba Amaral | 7,627 | 14.15% |
| Republican | Paul Dolan | 4,006 | 7.43% |
| Republican | Arturo Reyes | 3,319 | 6.16% |
| Republican | Emmanuel Tipon | 2,075 | 3.85% |
| Total votes | | 53,901 | 100.0% |

2024 United States Senate election in Hawaii
| Party | Candidate | Votes | % | ±% |
|---|---|---|---|---|
| Democratic | Mazie Hirono (incumbent) | 324,194 | 64.61% | −6.54% |
| Republican | Bob McDermott | 160,075 | 31.90% | +3.05% |
| We the People | Shelby Billionaire | 9,224 | 1.84% | N/A |
| Green | Emma Pohlman | 8,270 | 1.65% | N/A |
| Total votes | | 501,763 | 100.0% | N/A |
| Democratic hold | | | | |

== Indiana ==
Indiana election
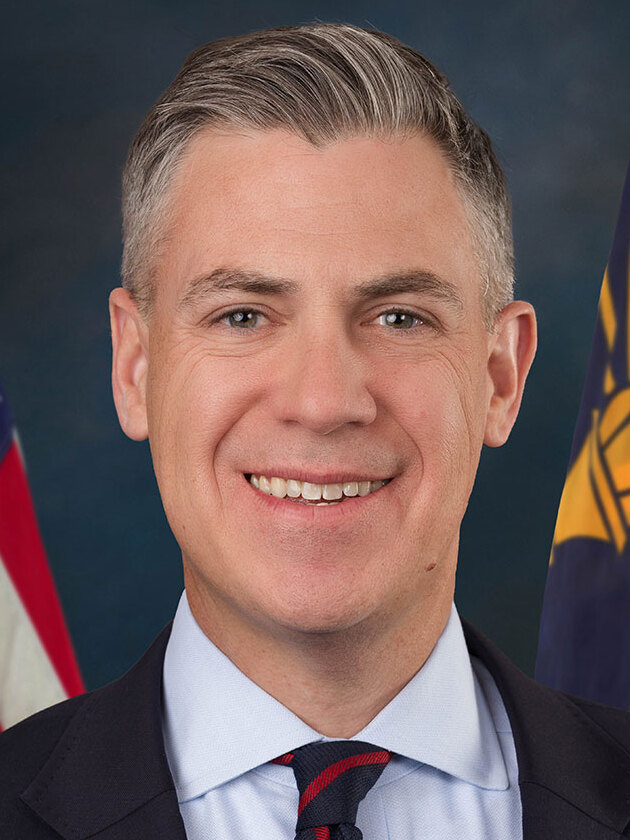

| Nominee | Jim Banks | Valerie McCray |
| Party | Republican | Democratic |
| Popular vote | 1,659,416 | 1,097,061 |
| Percentage | 58.64% | 38.77% |
- County results Banks: 40–50% 50–60% 60–70% 70–80% 80–90% McCray: 50–60% 60–70%
U.S. senator before election
Mike Braun
Republican
Elected U.S. Senator
Jim Banks
Republican

One-term Republican Mike Braun was elected in 2018 with 50.8% of the vote. Braun was retiring to prepare to run for governor of Indiana. U.S. representative Jim Banks ran unopposed in the primary after his only competition, businessman John Rust, was disqualified. Psychologist Valerie McCray defeated former state representative Marc Carmichael for the Democratic nomination.

On election day, Banks defeated McCray by nearly a 20-percentage-point margin, winning all but three counties.

Democratic primary results
| Party | Candidate | Votes | % |
|---|---|---|---|
| Democratic | Valerie McCray | 121,734 | 68.01% |
| Democratic | Marc Carmichael | 57,256 | 31.99% |
| Total votes | | 178,990 | 100.00% |

2024 United States Senate election in Indiana
| Party | Candidate | Votes | % | ±% |
|---|---|---|---|---|
| Republican | Jim Banks | 1,659,416 | 58.64% | +7.91% |
| Democratic | Valerie McCray | 1,097,061 | 38.77% | −6.07% |
| Libertarian | Andrew Horning | 73,233 | 2.59% | −1.83% |
| Write-in | | 187 | 0.00% | |
| Total votes | | 2,829,897 | 100.0% | |
| Republican hold | | | | |

== Maine ==
Maine election
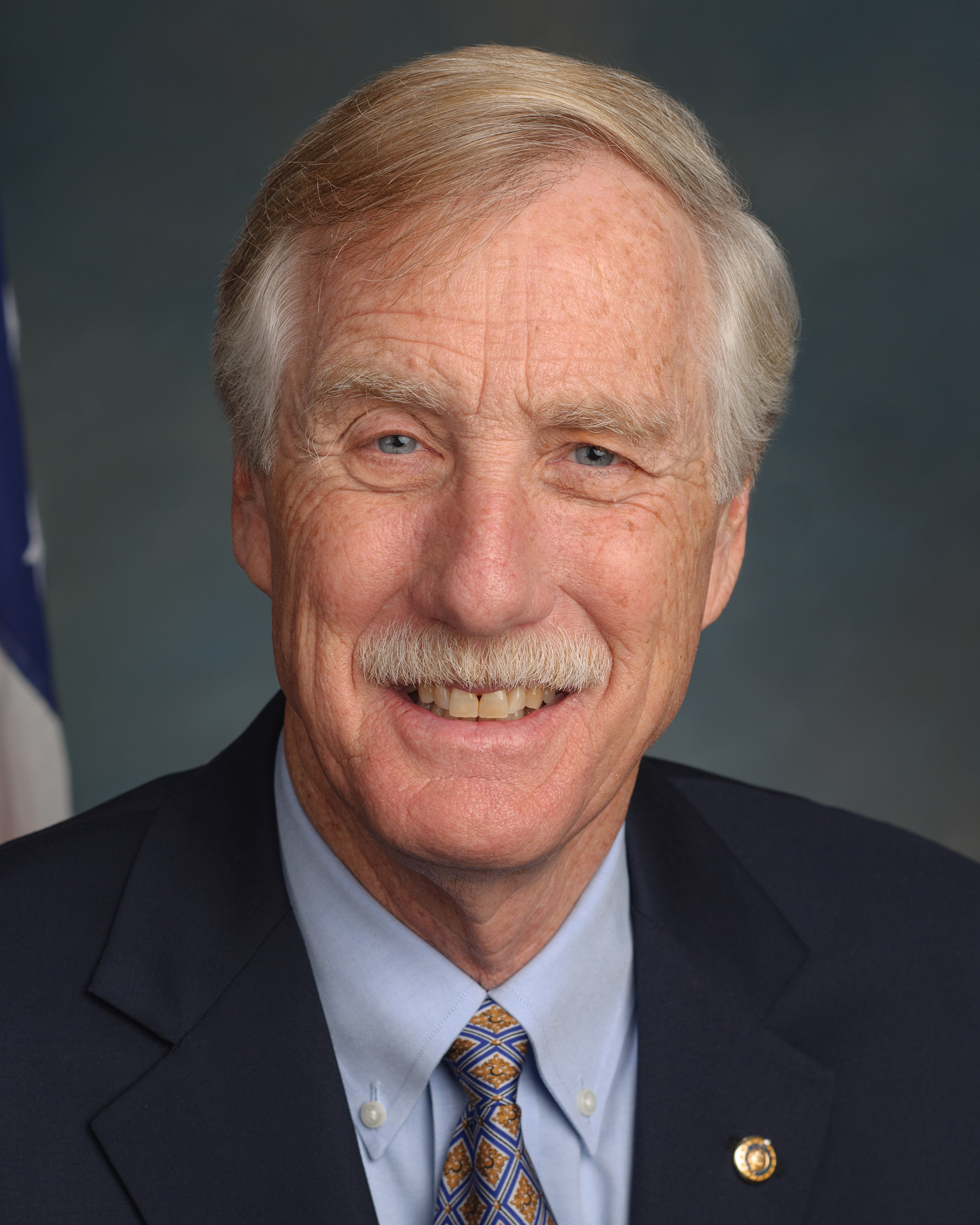

| Nominee | Angus King | Demitroula Kouzounas | David Costello |
| Party | Independent | Republican | Democratic |
| Popular vote | 427,331 | 284,338 | 88,891 |
| Percentage | 52.06% | 34.64% | 10.83% |
- King: 30–40% 40–50% 50–60% 60–70% 70–80% 90–100% Kouzonunas: 40–50% 50–60% 60–70% 70–80% 80–90% 90–100% Costello: 80–90% Tie: 40–50% 50%
U.S. senator before election
Angus King
Independent
Elected U.S. senator
Angus King
Independent

Two-term Independent incumbent Angus King was reelected in 2018 with 54.3% of the vote in a three-candidate election. He intended to run for a third term, despite previously hinting that he might retire. Democratic consultant David Costello and dentist Demitroula Kouzounas, a former Maine Republican Party chair, each won their respective party primaries unopposed. They would both face King in the general election in November.

King was easily re-elected with over 52% of the vote, despite a slight decrease in his margin.

2024 United States Senate election in Maine
| Party | Candidate | Votes | % | ±% |
|---|---|---|---|---|
| Independent | Angus King (incumbent) | 427,331 | 52.06% | −2.25 |
| Republican | Demi Kouzounas | 284,338 | 34.64% | −0.59 |
| Democratic | David Costello | 88,891 | 10.83% | +0.38 |
| Independent | Jason Cherry | 20,222 | 2.46% | N/A |
| Total votes | | 820,782 | 100.00% | N/A |
| Independent hold | | | | |

== Maryland ==
Maryland election
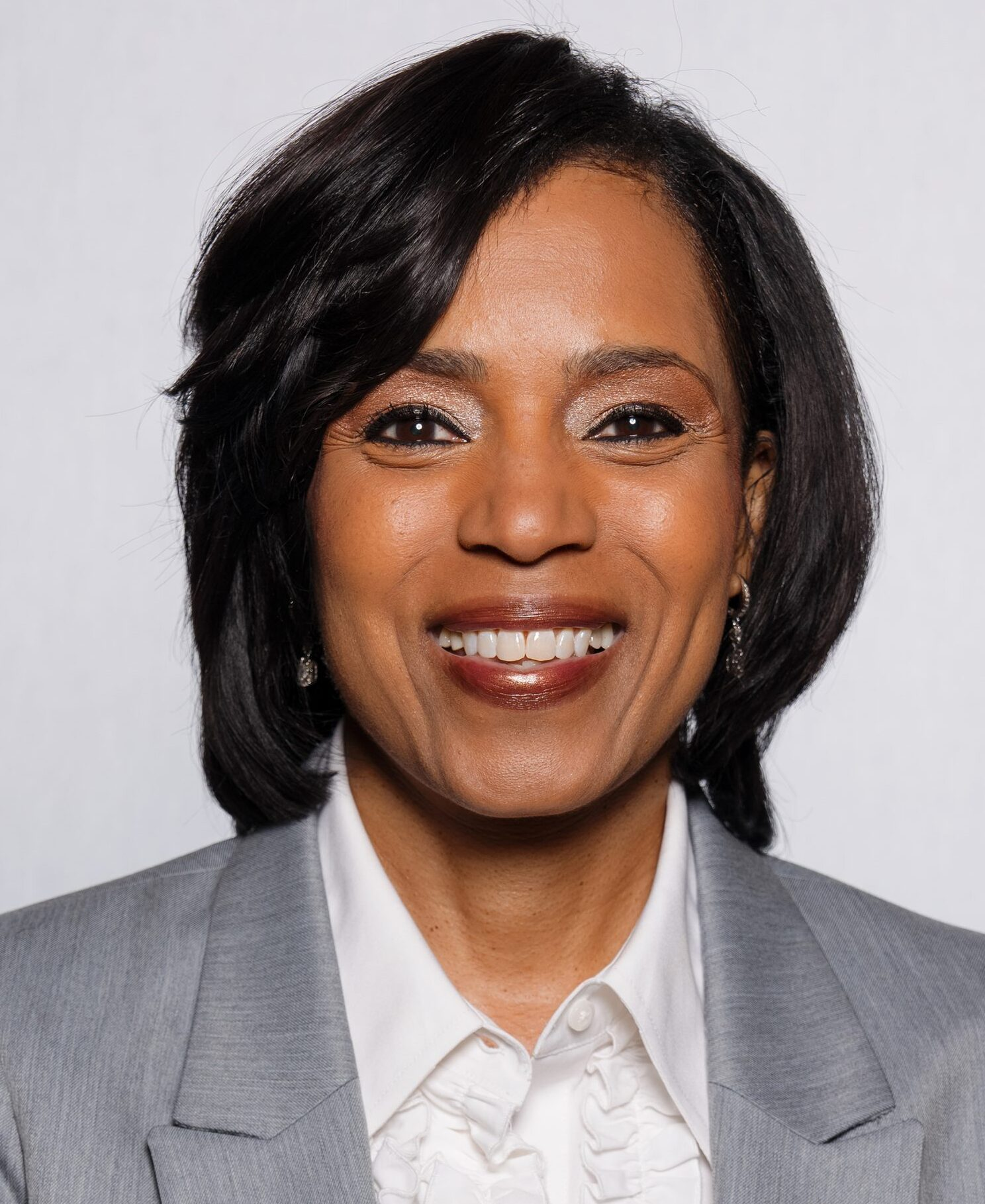

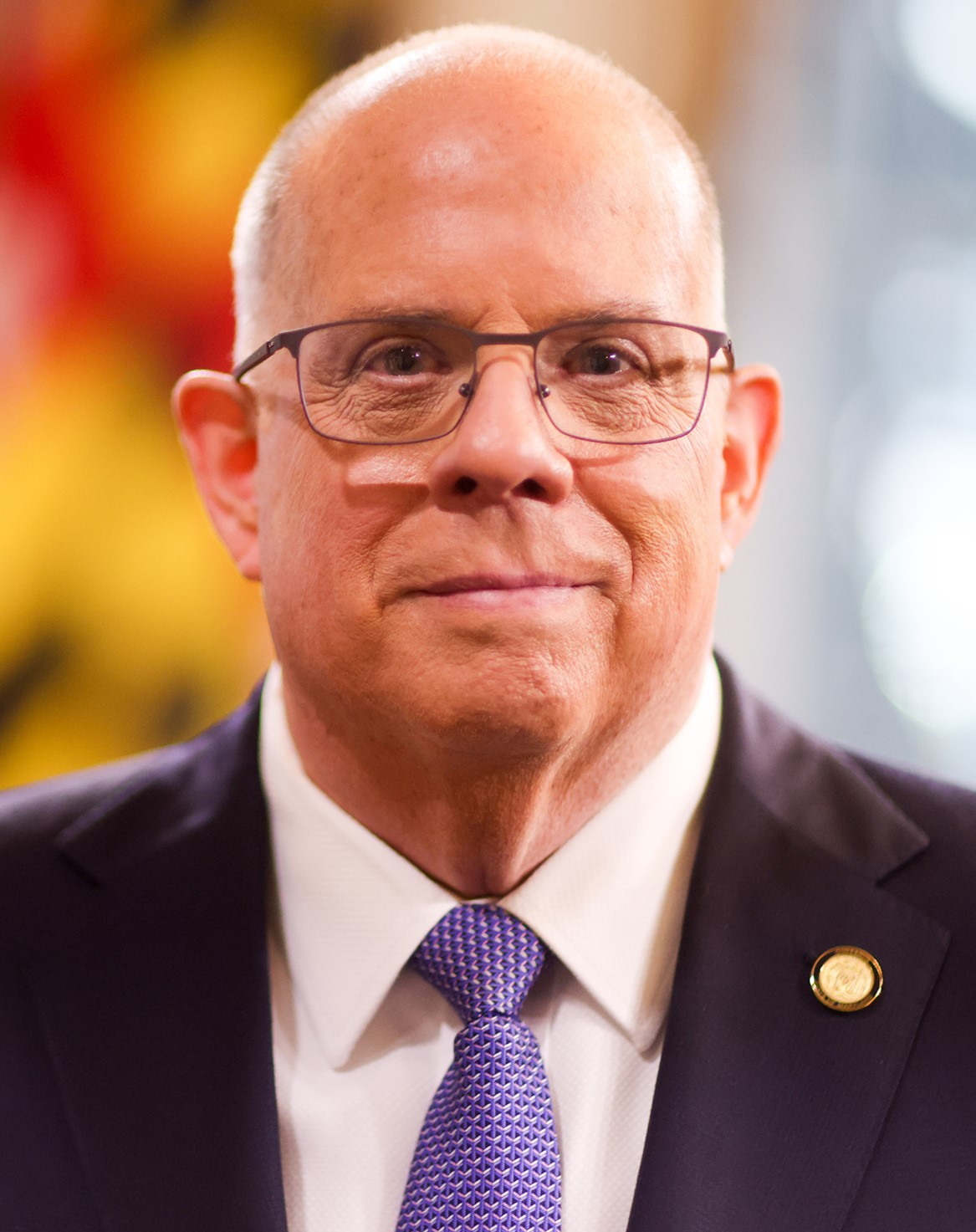
| Nominee | Angela Alsobrooks | Larry Hogan |
| Party | Democratic | Republican |
| Popular vote | 1,650,912 | 1,294,344 |
| Percentage | 54.64% | 42.84% |
- County results Alsobrooks: 50–60% 60–70% 70–80% 80–90% Hogan: 50–60% 60–70% 70–80%
U.S. senator before election
Ben Cardin
Democratic
Elected U.S. Senator
Angela Alsobrooks
Democratic

Three-term Democrat Ben Cardin was reelected in 2018 with 64.9% of the vote. On May 1, 2023, Cardin announced he was not running for reelection.

Prince George's County executive Angela Alsobrooks defeated U.S. representative David Trone for the Democratic nomination after a contentious primary, where Trone spent heavily from his personal wealth while Alsobrooks had the support of most elected Democrats. Former governor Larry Hogan easily defeated conservative former state delegate Robin Ficker for the Republican nomination. A popular moderate known for his political independence, Hogan had previously declined to run, but unexpectedly filed to run hours before the candidate filing deadline.

Angela defeated Hogan by a 11 point margin, a significant drop from Cardin's 2018 performance. Hogan's margin was 17 points better than Trump's margin in Maryland, the largest gap between senatorial and presidential margins in the 2024 cycle, and this election was the closest Senate race in Maryland since 2006. Hogan carried Anne Arundel and Frederick counties—both won by Kamala Harris in the presidential race—and became the first Republican to exceed one million votes in a Maryland U.S. Senate election, the highest total for a Republican in the state's history. Despite this, Hogan could not overcome Alsobrooks's margins in the Washington–Baltimore metropolitan area, and lost the election by nearly 12 points.

Democratic primary results
| Party | Candidate | Votes | % |
|---|---|---|---|
| Democratic | Angela Alsobrooks | 357,052 | 53.37% |
| Democratic | David Trone | 286,381 | 42.80% |
| Democratic | Joseph Perez | 4,688 | 0.70% |
| Democratic | Michael Cobb | 4,524 | 0.68% |
| Democratic | Brian Frydenborg | 3,635 | 0.54% |
| Democratic | Scottie Griffin | 3,579 | 0.53% |
| Democratic | Marcellus Crews | 3,379 | 0.51% |
| Democratic | Andrew Wildman | 2,198 | 0.33% |
| Democratic | Robert Houton | 1,946 | 0.29% |
| Democratic | Steve Seuferer | 1,664 | 0.25% |
| Total votes | | 669,046 | 100.00% |

Republican primary results
| Party | Candidate | Votes | % |
|---|---|---|---|
| Republican | Larry Hogan | 183,661 | 64.18% |
| Republican | Robin Ficker | 79,517 | 27.79% |
| Republican | Chris Chaffee | 9,134 | 3.19% |
| Republican | Lorie Friend | 5,867 | 2.05% |
| Republican | John A. Myrick | 4,987 | 1.74% |
| Republican | Moe Barakat | 2,203 | 0.77% |
| Republican | Laban Seyoum | 782 | 0.27% |
| Total votes | | 286,151 | 100.00% |

2024 United States Senate election in Maryland
| Party | Candidate | Votes | % | ±% |
|---|---|---|---|---|
| Democratic | Angela Alsobrooks | 1,650,912 | 54.64% | −10.22% |
| Republican | Larry Hogan | 1,294,344 | 42.84% | +12.53% |
| Libertarian | Mike Scott | 69,396 | 2.30% | +1.30% |
| Write-in | | 6,726 | 0.22% | +0.12% |
| Total votes | | 3,021,378 | 100.00% | |
| Democratic hold | | | | |

== Massachusetts ==
Massachusetts election
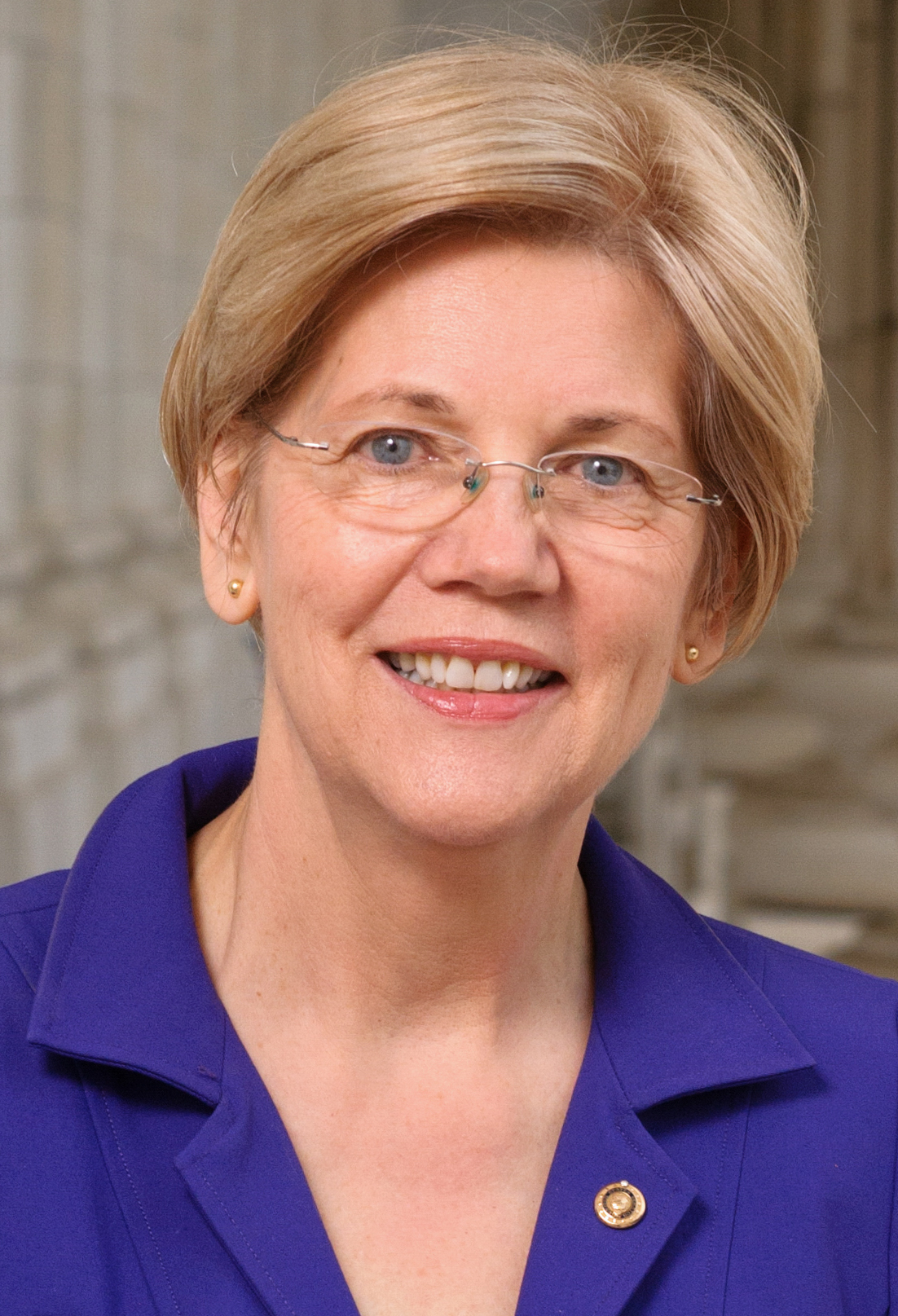

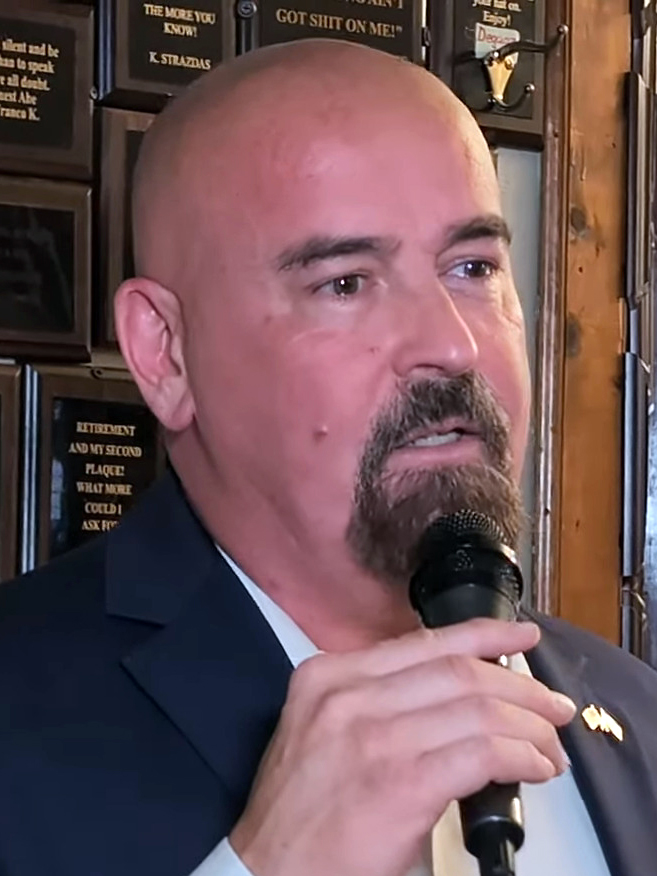
| Nominee | Elizabeth Warren | John Deaton |
| Party | Democratic | Republican |
| Popular vote | 2,041,668 | 1,365,440 |
| Percentage | 59.81% | 40.00% |
- Warren: 50–60% 60–70% 70–80% 80–90% 90–100% Deaton: 50–60% 60–70%
U.S. senator before election
Elizabeth Warren
Democratic
Elected U.S. senator
Elizabeth Warren
Democratic

Two-term Democrat Elizabeth Warren was reelected in 2018 with 60.3% of the vote. On March 27, 2023, Warren announced that she was running for reelection. Software company owner Robert Antonellis, Quincy City Council president Ian Cain, and attorney John Deaton ran as Republicans.

Though Warren won by 19 points, this election marked the first time that she had lost Bristol County while running for the office. Warren underperformed Kamala Harris by 6 points in the concurrent presidential election, making her the second-worst Democratic Senate performer in the 2024 cycle after Angela Alsobrooks in Maryland.

Republican primary results
| Party | Candidate | Votes | % |
|---|---|---|---|
| Republican | John Deaton | 136,773 | 64.51% |
| Republican | Robert Antonellis | 54,940 | 25.91% |
| Republican | Ian Cain | 19,374 | 9.14% |
| Write-in | | 924 | 0.44% |
| Total votes | | 212,011 | 100.0% |

2024 United States Senate election in Massachusetts
| Party | Candidate | Votes | % | ±% |
|---|---|---|---|---|
| Democratic | Elizabeth Warren (incumbent) | 2,041,668 | 59.81% | −0.53 |
| Republican | John Deaton | 1,365,440 | 40.00% | +3.83 |
| Write-in | | 6,221 | 0.18% | +0.08 |
| Total votes | | 3,413,329 | 100.00% | N/A |
| Democratic hold | | | | |

== Michigan ==
Michigan election
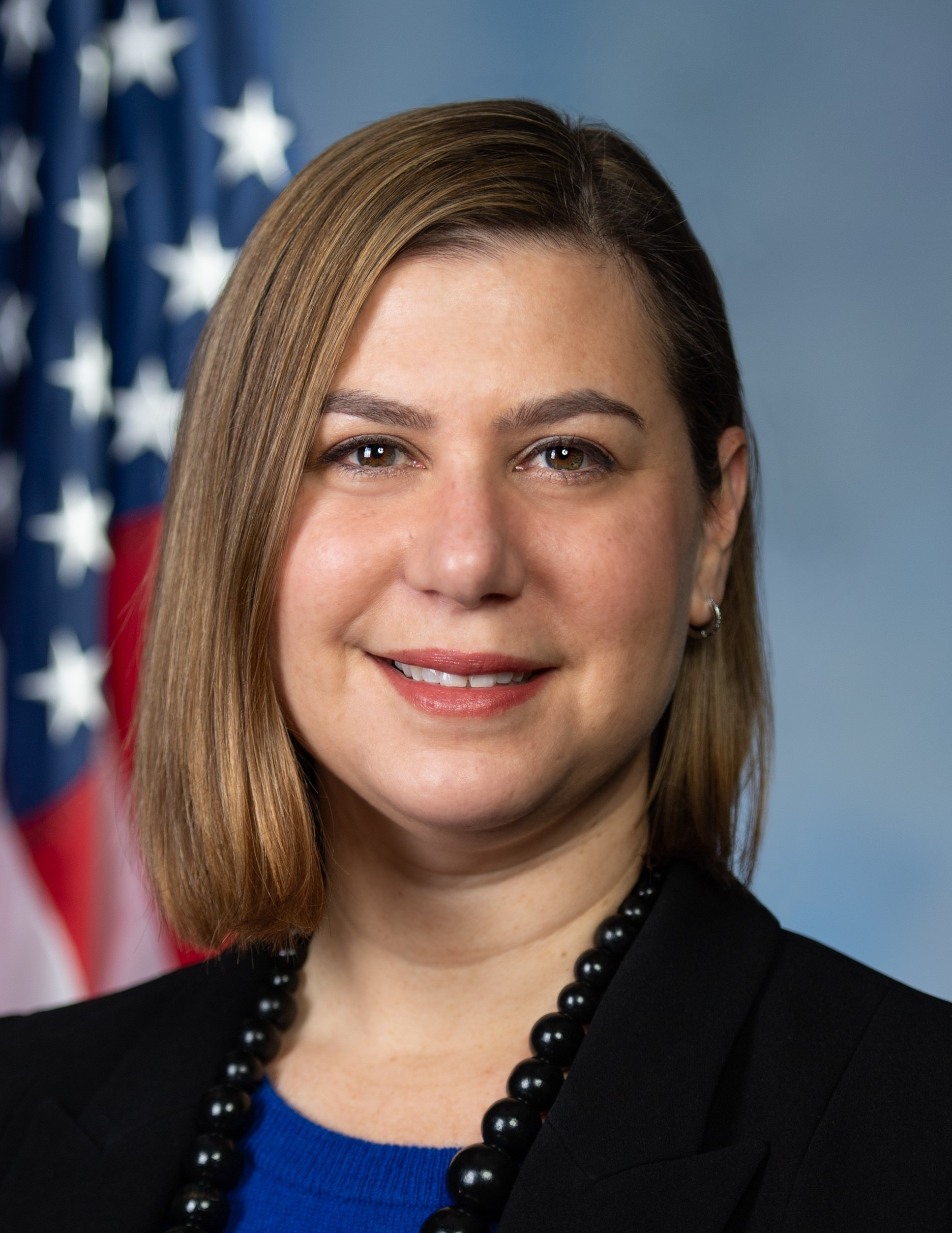

| Nominee | Elissa Slotkin | Mike Rogers |
| Party | Democratic | Republican |
| Popular vote | 2,712,686 | 2,693,680 |
| Percentage | 48.64% | 48.30% |
- County results Slotkin: 40-50% 50–60% 60–70% 70–80% Rogers: 40–50% 50–60% 60–70% 70–80%
U.S. senator before election
Debbie Stabenow
Democratic
Elected U.S. Senator
Elissa Slotkin
Democratic

Four-term Democrat Debbie Stabenow was reelected in 2018 with 52.3% of the vote. She announced on January 5, 2023, that she would retire, and would not run for a fifth term.

Representative Elissa Slotkin and actor Hill Harper ran for the Democratic nomination. Former U.S. representatives Mike Rogers and Justin Amash, and hedge fund manager Sandy Pensler ran for the Republican nomination. The nominees were Slotkin and Rogers, who easily won their primaries as expected.

Slotkin narrowly defeated Rogers in general election by a 0.34% margin. Slotkin won 48.64% of the vote compared to Rogers' 48.3%. On November 6, 2024, major news organizations projected that Slotkin had won the election. Slotkin received 23,847 fewer votes than Kamala Harris, while Rogers received 122,956 fewer votes than Donald Trump. As Republican presidential nominee Donald Trump carried Michigan on the same ballot, this was the first time Michigan voted for candidates of different political parties for U.S. senator and president since Democrat Don Riegle was re-elected as Republican George H. W. Bush carried the state in 1988.

Democratic primary results
| Party | Candidate | Votes | % |
|---|---|---|---|
| Democratic | Elissa Slotkin | 712,791 | 76.33% |
| Democratic | Hill Harper | 221,053 | 23.67% |
| Total votes | | 933,844 | 100.0% |

Republican primary results
| Party | Candidate | Votes | % |
|---|---|---|---|
| Republican | Mike Rogers | 555,766 | 63.19% |
| Republican | Justin Amash | 137,565 | 15.64% |
| Republican | Sherry O'Donnell | 106,466 | 12.10% |
| Republican | Sandy Pensler (withdrawn) | 79,772 | 9.07% |
| Total votes | | 879,569 | 100.0% |

2024 United States Senate election in Michigan
| Party | Candidate | Votes | % | ±% |
|---|---|---|---|---|
| Democratic | Elissa Slotkin | 2,712,686 | 48.64% | −3.62% |
| Republican | Mike Rogers | 2,693,680 | 48.30% | +2.54% |
| Libertarian | Joseph Solis-Mullen | 56,697 | 1.02% | N/A |
| Green | Douglas Marsh | 53,978 | 0.97% | +0.02% |
| U.S. Taxpayers' | Dave Stein | 41,363 | 0.74% | +0.09% |
| Natural Law | Doug Dern | 18,779 | 0.34% | −0.05% |
| Total votes | | 5,577,183 | 100.0% | |
| Democratic hold | | | | |

== Minnesota ==
Minnesota election
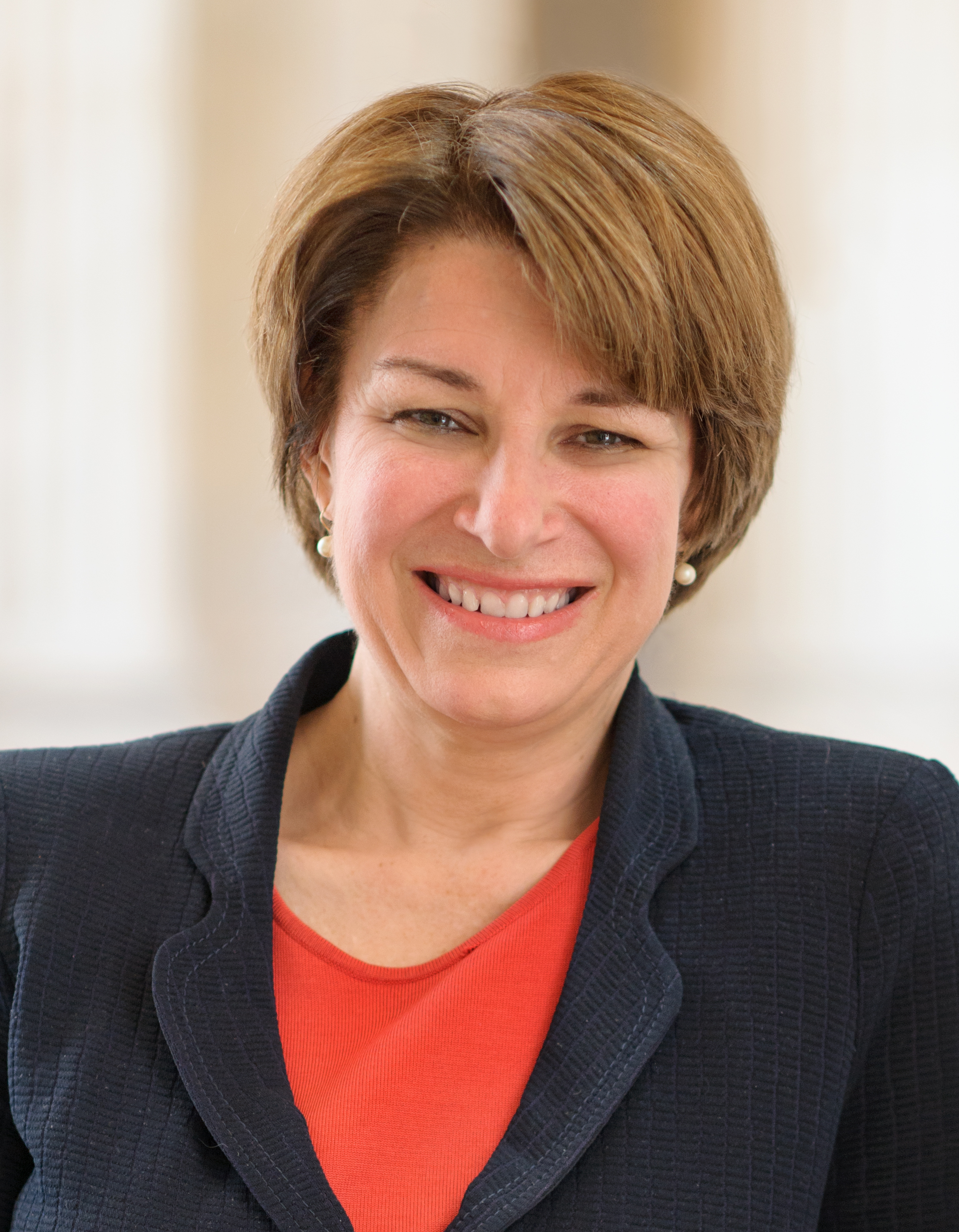

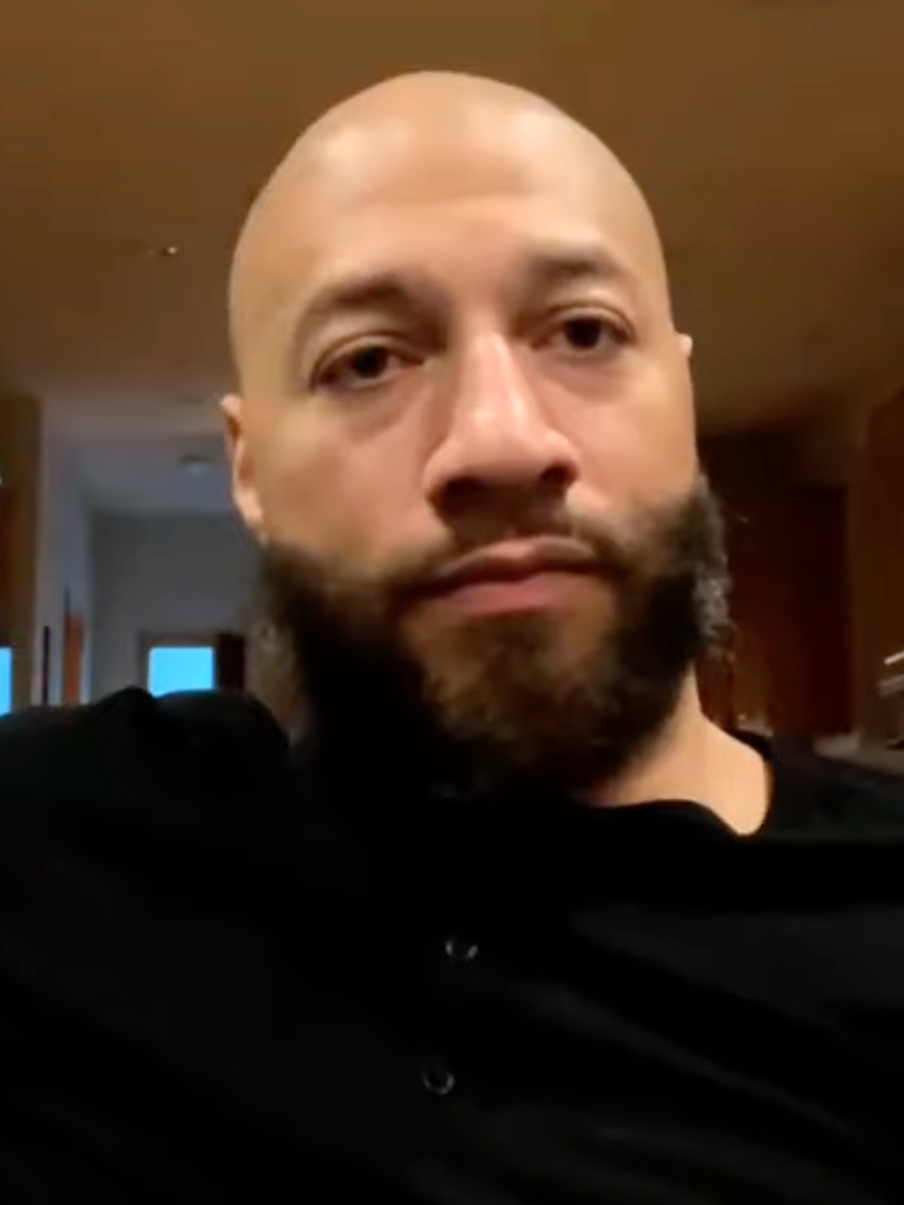
| Nominee | Amy Klobuchar | Royce White |
| Party | Democratic (DFL) | Republican |
| Popular vote | 1,792,441 | 1,291,712 |
| Percentage | 56.20% | 40.50% |
- County results Klobuchar: 40–50% 50–60% 60–70% 70–80% White: 40–50% 50–60% 60–70%
U.S. senator before election
Amy Klobuchar
Democratic (DFL)
Elected U.S. Senator
Amy Klobuchar
Democratic (DFL)

Three-term Democrat Amy Klobuchar was reelected in 2018 with 60.3% of the vote. She ran for a fourth term.

In the August 13 Republican primary, former NBA basketball player Royce White won an eight-candidate primary with 38% of the vote, with banker and retired U.S. Navy commander Joe Fraser finishing second with 29% of the vote. Third-party candidates consisted of guardianship advocate and Republican candidate for governor in 2022, Independence-Alliance Party candidate, Joyce Lacy.

Democratic (DFL) primary results
| Party | Candidate | Votes | % |
|---|---|---|---|
| Democratic (DFL) | Amy Klobuchar (incumbent) | 305,055 | 94.29% |
| Democratic (DFL) | Steve Carlson | 9,535 | 2.95% |
| Democratic (DFL) | Ahmad Hassan | 4,891 | 1.51% |
| Democratic (DFL) | Ole Savior | 2,478 | 0.77% |
| Democratic (DFL) | George Kalberer | 1,578 | 0.49% |
| Total votes | | 323,537 | 100.0% |

Republican primary results
| Party | Candidate | Votes | % |
|---|---|---|---|
| Republican | Royce White | 74,814 | 38.50% |
| Republican | Joe Fraser | 56,909 | 29.29% |
| Republican | Raymond Petersen | 16,237 | 8.36% |
| Republican | Alycia Gruenhagen | 15,017 | 7.73% |
| Republican | John Berman | 14,158 | 7.29% |
| Republican | Patrick Munro | 9,444 | 4.86% |
| Republican | Christopher Seymore | 5,020 | 2.58% |
| Republican | Loner Blue | 2,727 | 1.40% |
| Total votes | | 194,326 | 100.0% |

2024 United States Senate election in Minnesota
| Party | Candidate | Votes | % | ±% |
|---|---|---|---|---|
| Democratic (DFL) | Amy Klobuchar (incumbent) | 1,792,441 | 56.20% | −4.11% |
| Republican | Royce White | 1,291,712 | 40.50% | +4.29% |
| Libertarian | Rebecca Whiting | 55,215 | 1.73% | N/A |
| Independence | Joyce Lacey | 46,377 | 1.45% | N/A |
| Write-in | | 3,578 | 0.11% | +0.07% |
| Total votes | | 3,189,323 | 100.00% | N/A |
| Democratic (DFL) hold | | | | |

== Mississippi ==
Mississippi election

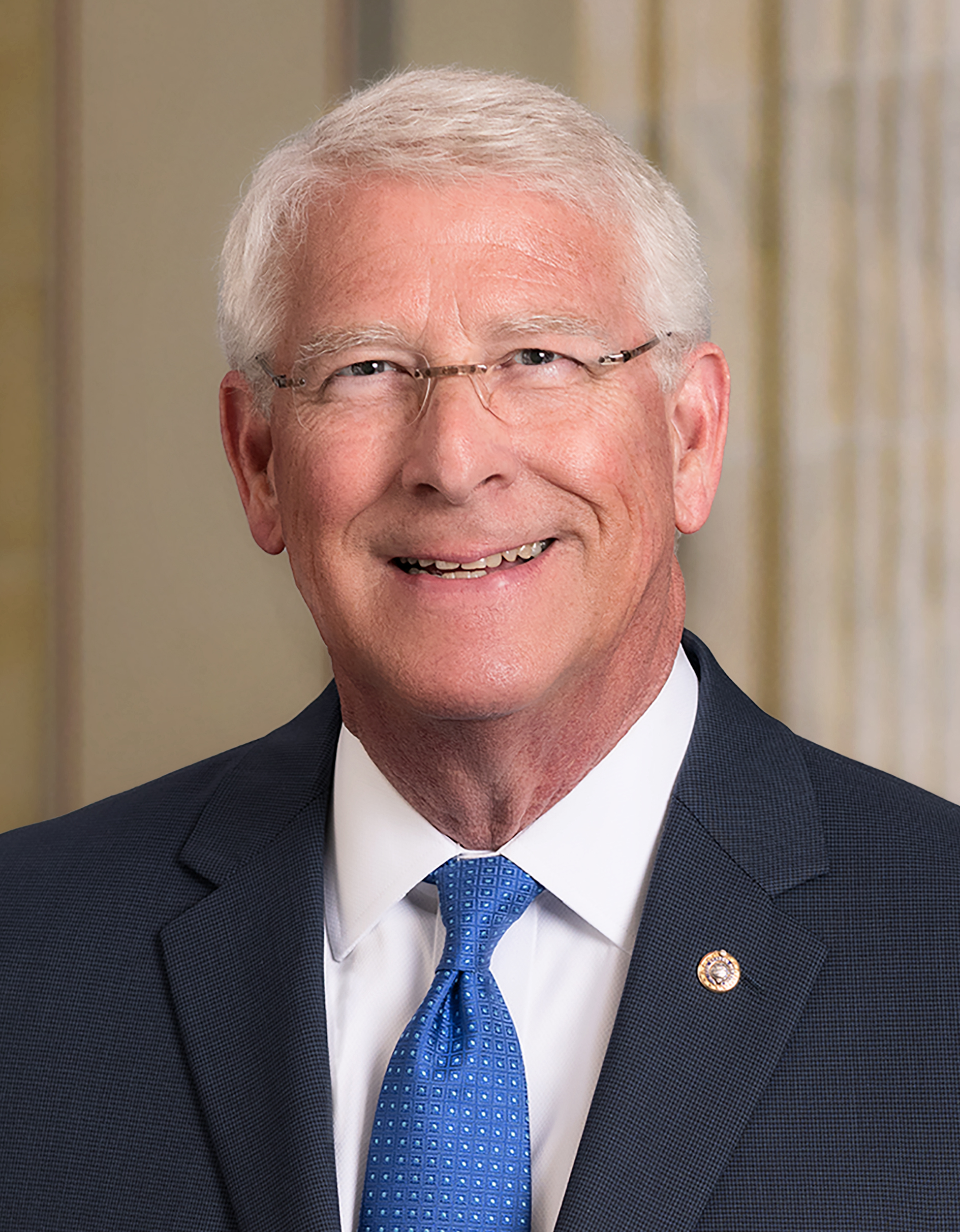

| Nominee | Roger Wicker | Ty Pinkins |
| Party | Republican | Democratic |
| Popular vote | 763,420 | 451,981 |
| Percentage | 62.81% | 37.19% |
- County results Wicker: 50–60% 60–70% 70–80% 80–90% Pinkins: 50–60% 60–70% 70–80%
U.S. senator before election
Roger Wicker
Republican
Elected U.S. senator
Roger Wicker
Republican

Two-term Republican Roger Wicker was reelected in 2018 with 58.5% of the vote. Wicker ran for a third full term. He faced a primary challenge from conservative state representative Dan Eubanks and won by a comfortable margin. Wicker would face Democratic lawyer Ty Pinkins in the general election.

Wicker easily won re-election by a 25 point margin, improving his previous performances.

Republican primary results
| Party | Candidate | Votes | % |
|---|---|---|---|
| Republican | Roger Wicker (incumbent) | 152,086 | 61.40% |
| Republican | Ghannon Burton | 61,387 | 24.78% |
| Republican | Dan Eubanks | 34,238 | 13.82% |
| Total votes | | 247,711 | 100.00% |

2024 United States Senate election in Mississippi
| Party | Candidate | Votes | % | ±% |
|---|---|---|---|---|
| Republican | Roger Wicker (incumbent) | 763,420 | 62.81% | +4.32% |
| Democratic | Ty Pinkins | 451,981 | 37.19% | −2.28% |
| Total votes | | 1,215,401 | 100.00% | N/A |
| Republican hold | | | | |

== Missouri ==
Missouri election
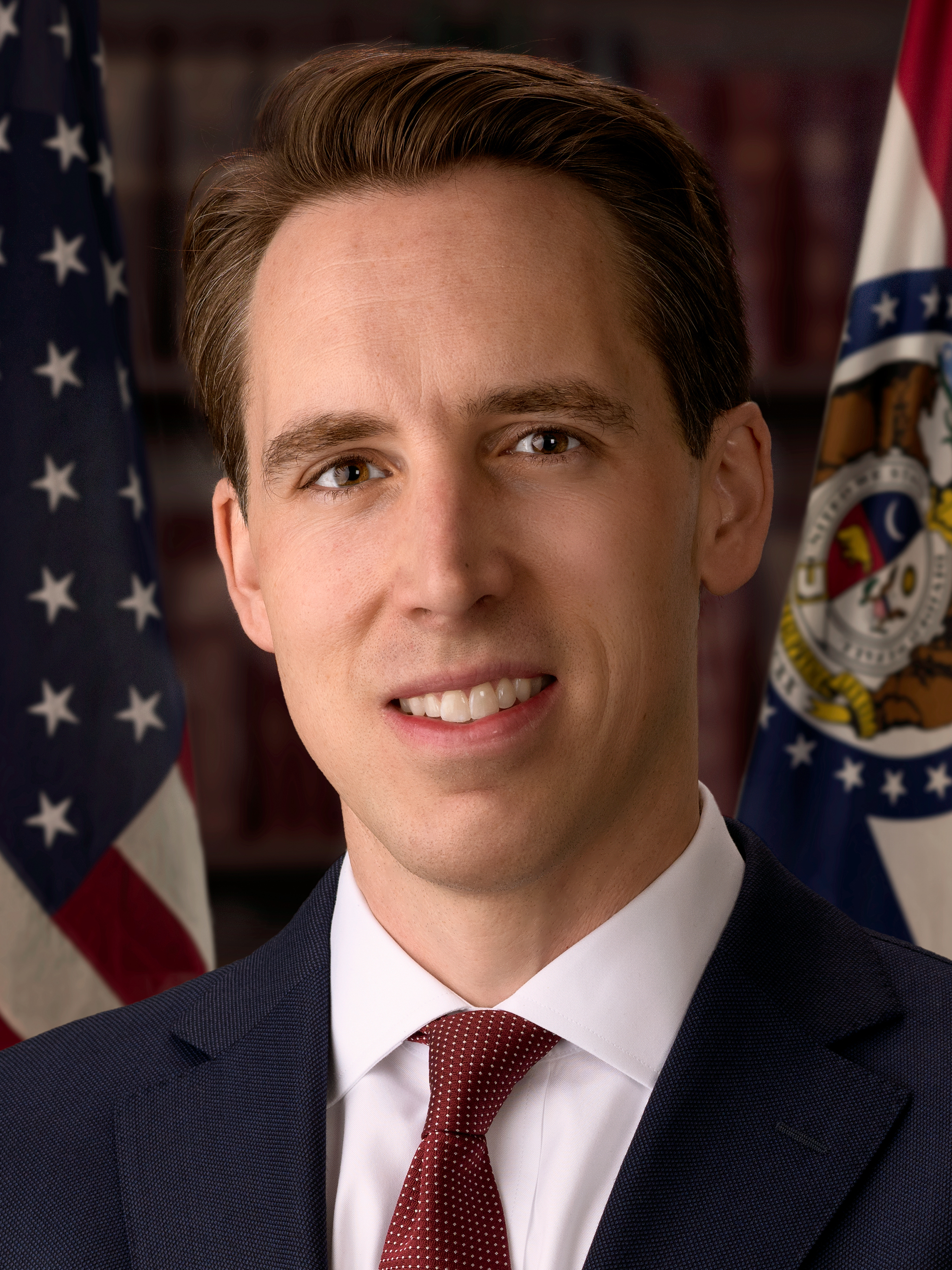

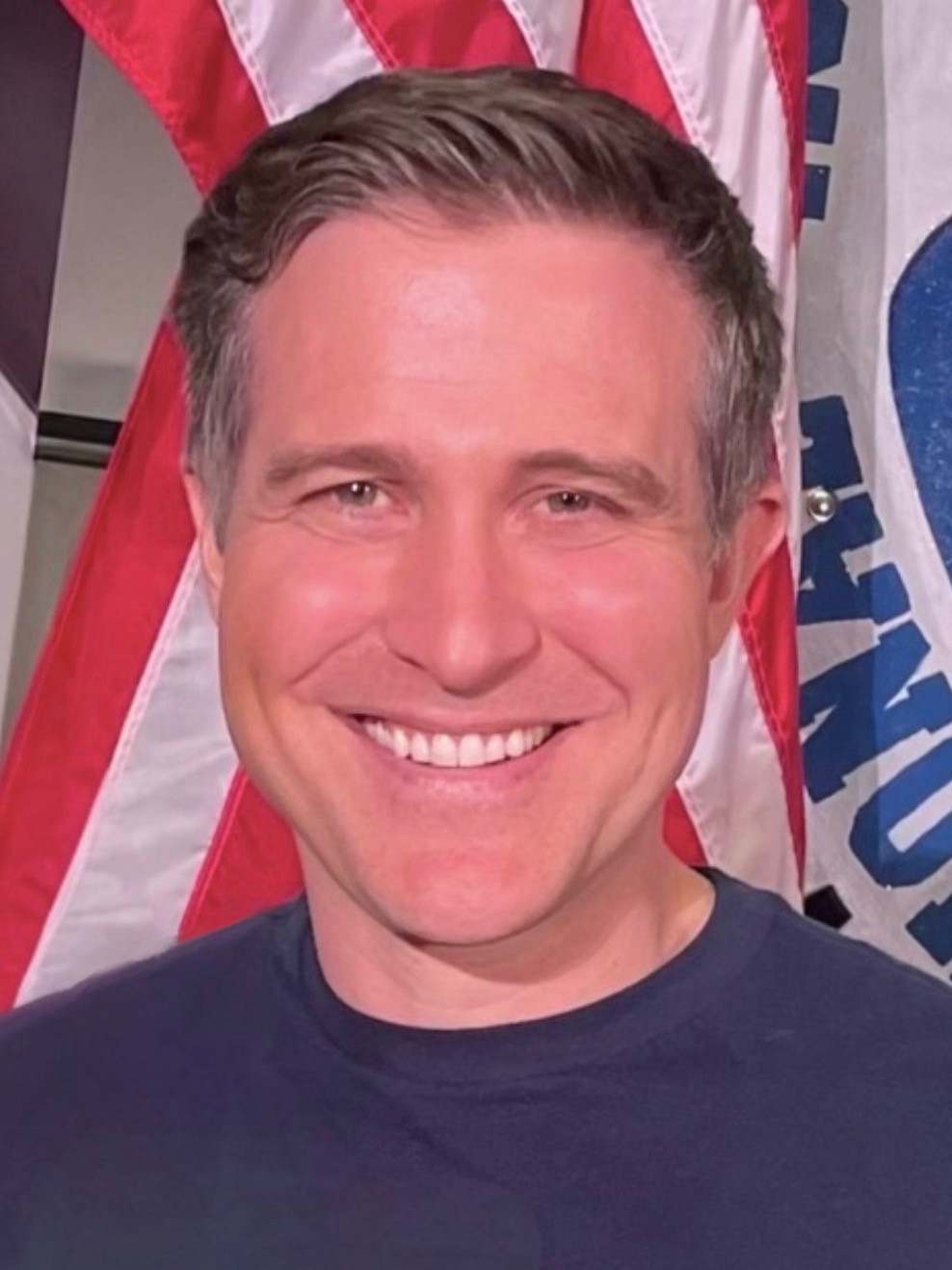
| Nominee | Josh Hawley | Lucas Kunce |
| Party | Republican | Democratic |
| Popular vote | 1,651,907 | 1,243,728 |
| Percentage | 55.57% | 41.84% |
- County results Hawley: 40–50% 50–60% 60–70% 70–80% 80–90% Kunce: 40–50% 50–60% 60–70% 80–90%
U.S. senator before election
Josh Hawley
Republican
Elected U.S. Senator
Josh Hawley
Republican

One-term Republican Josh Hawley was elected in 2018 with 51.4% of the vote. Hawley ran for a second term. Marine veteran Lucas Kunce, who ran unsuccessfully for the Class III seat in 2022, won the Democratic nomination.

Hawley defeated Kunce to win reelection by a 14 point margin, a significant improvement from his 6 point margin in 2018.

Democratic primary results
| Party | Candidate | Votes | % |
|---|---|---|---|
| Democratic | Lucas Kunce | 255,775 | 67.64% |
| Democratic | Karla May | 87,908 | 23.25% |
| Democratic | December Harmon | 26,804 | 7.09% |
| Democratic | Mita Biswas | 7,647 | 2.02% |
| Total votes | | 378,134 | 100.0% |

2024 United States Senate election in Missouri
| Party | Candidate | Votes | % | ±% |
|---|---|---|---|---|
| Republican | Josh Hawley (incumbent) | 1,651,907 | 55.57% | ▲4.19 |
| Democratic | Lucas Kunce | 1,243,728 | 41.84% | ▼3.73 |
| Libertarian | W.C. Young | 35,671 | 1.20% | ▲0.08 |
| Better Party | Jared Young | 21,111 | 0.71% | N/A |
| Green | Nathan Kline | 20,123 | 0.68% | ▲0.16 |
| Write-in | | 19 | 0.00% | Steady |
| Total votes | | 2,972,559 | 100.00% | N/A |
| Republican hold | | | | |

== Montana ==
Montana election
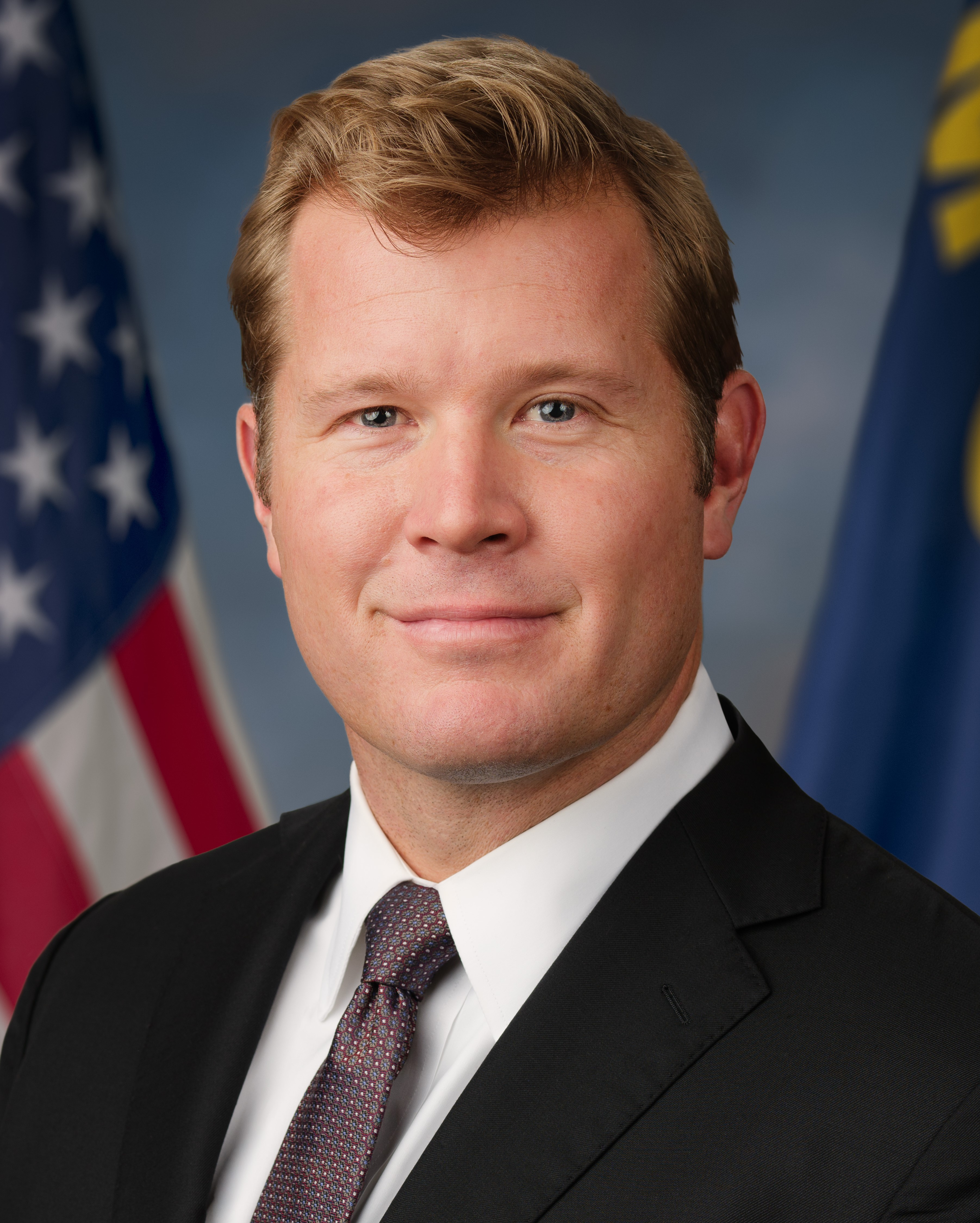

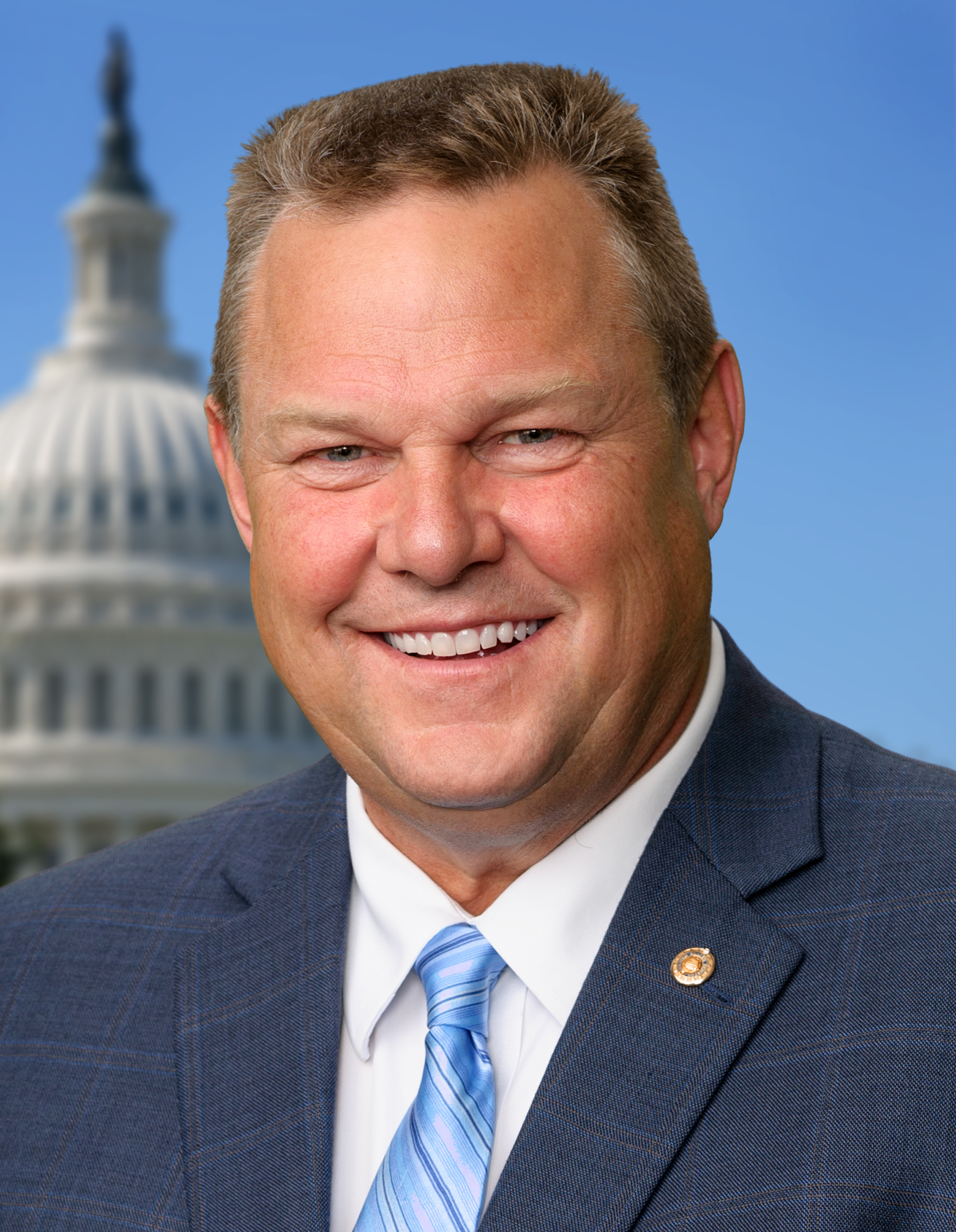
| Nominee | Tim Sheehy | Jon Tester |
| Party | Republican | Democratic |
| Popular vote | 319,682 | 276,305 |
| Percentage | 52.64% | 45.50% |
- County results Sheehy: 50–60% 60–70% 70–80% 80–90% >90% Tester: 50–60% 60–70% 70–80%
U.S. senator before election
Jon Tester
Democratic
Elected U.S. Senator
Tim Sheehy
Republican

Three-term Democrat Jon Tester was narrowly reelected in 2018 with 50.3% of the vote. On February 22, 2023, he announced he was running for a fourth term. Tester was one of two Democratic senators running for reelection who represented states won by Republican Donald Trump in both the 2016 and 2020 presidential elections. Businessman and former Navy SEAL officer Tim Sheehy won the Republican nomination. U.S. representative Matt Rosendale, also a Republican, initially ran against Sheehy for the nomination, but withdrew from the race within days.

Sheehy defeated Tester in the general election by over 7 points, marking the first time since 1911 that the Republican Party controlled both of Montana's senate seats.

Democratic primary results
| Party | Candidate | Votes | % |
|---|---|---|---|
| Democratic | Jon Tester (incumbent) | 104,279 | 96.96% |
| Democratic | Michael Hummert | 3,272 | 3.04% |
| Total votes | | 107,551 | 100.00% |

Republican primary results
| Party | Candidate | Votes | % |
|---|---|---|---|
| Republican | Tim Sheehy | 139,857 | 73.60% |
| Republican | Brad Johnson | 36,926 | 19.43% |
| Republican | Charles Walkingchild Sr. | 13,229 | 6.96% |
| Total votes | | 190,012 | 100.00% |

2024 United States Senate election in Montana
| Party | Candidate | Votes | % | ±% |
|---|---|---|---|---|
| Republican | Tim Sheehy | 319,682 | 52.64% | +5.86% |
| Democratic | Jon Tester (incumbent) | 276,305 | 45.50% | −4.83% |
| Libertarian | Sid Daoud | 7,272 | 1.20% | −1.68% |
| Green | Robert Barb | 4,003 | 0.66% | N/A |
| Total votes | | 607,262 | 100.00% | N/A |
| Republican gain from Democratic | | | | |

== Nebraska ==
There were two elections in Nebraska, due to the resignation of Ben Sasse.

=== Nebraska (regular) ===
Nebraska general election
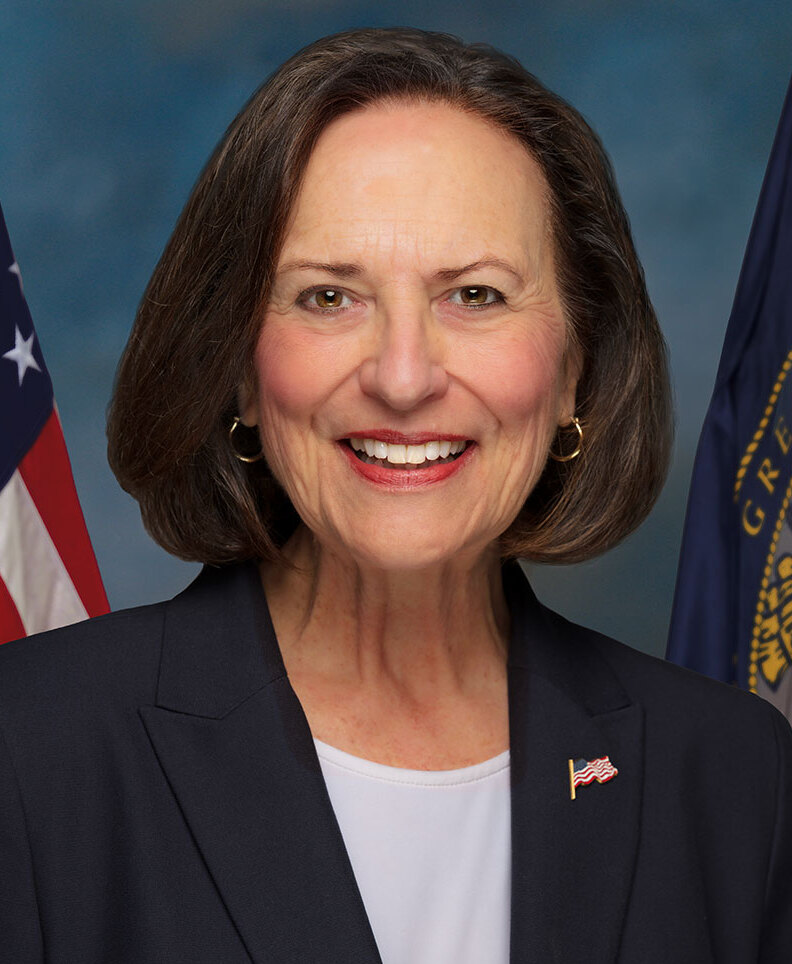

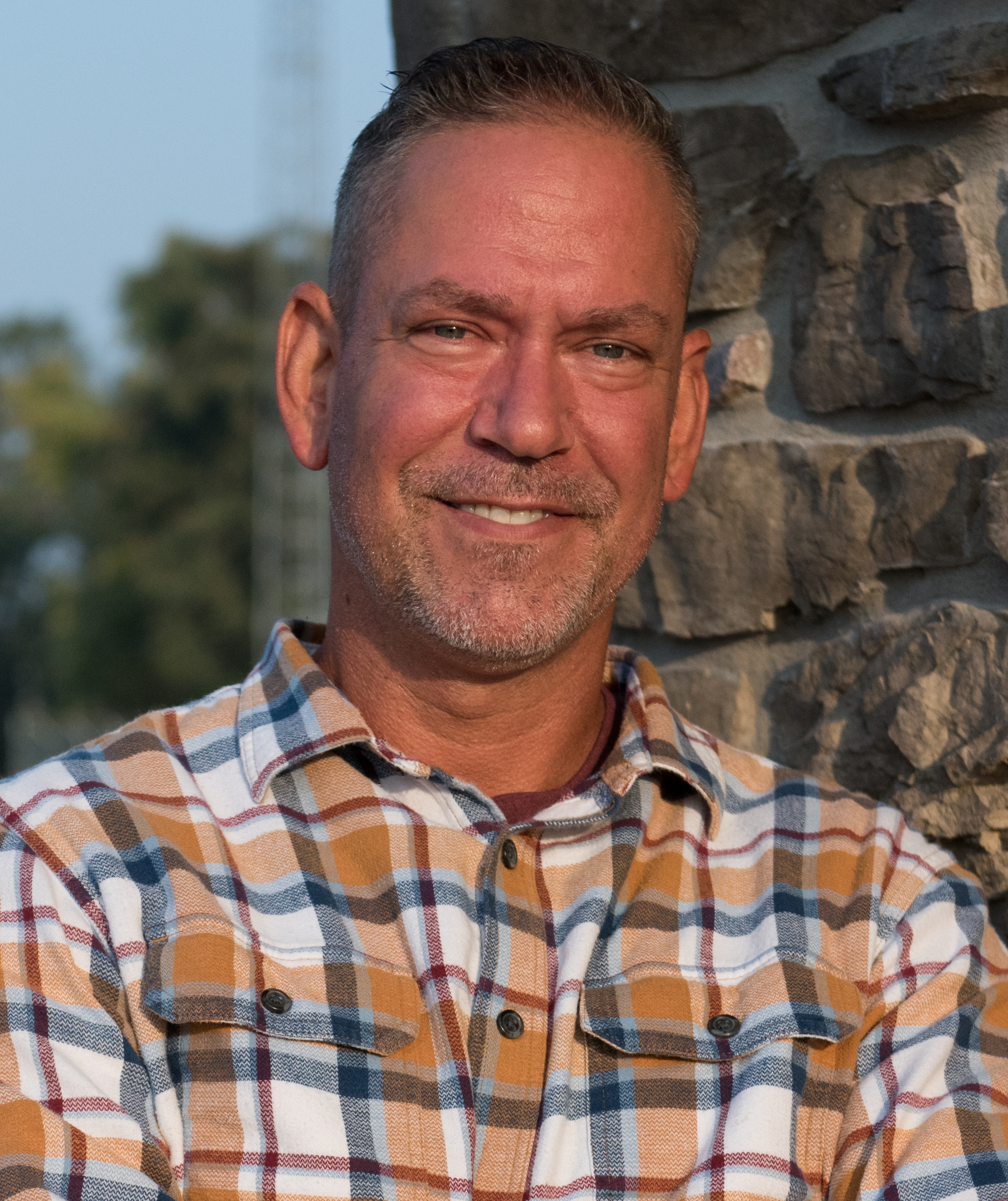
| Nominee | Deb Fischer | Dan Osborn |
| Party | Republican | Independent |
| Popular vote | 499,124 | 436,493 |
| Percentage | 53.19% | 46.52% |
- County results Fischer: 50–60% 60–70% 70–80% 80–90% Osborn: 50–60%
U.S. senator before election
Deb Fischer
Republican
Elected U.S. senator
Deb Fischer
Republican

Two-term Republican Deb Fischer was reelected in 2018 with 57.7% of the vote. On May 14, 2021, Fischer announced she was seeking reelection, despite previously declaring an intention to retire. Dan Osborn, a union leader and steamfitter, ran as an independent. Since Osborn declared, the Democratic Party fielded no candidates in order to endorse him, but he stated he would accept the help of no parties.

Fischer comfortably won re-election, defeating Osborn.

Republican primary results
| Party | Candidate | Votes | % |
|---|---|---|---|
| Republican | Deb Fischer (incumbent) | 174,820 | 79.76% |
| Republican | Arron Kowalski | 44,334 | 20.24% |
| Total votes | | 219,154 | 100.00% |

2024 United States Senate election in Nebraska
| Party | Candidate | Votes | % | ±% |
|---|---|---|---|---|
| Republican | Deb Fischer (incumbent) | 499,124 | 53.19% | −4.50% |
| Independent | Dan Osborn | 436,493 | 46.52% | — |
| Write-in | | 2,719 | 0.29% | — |
| Total votes | | 938,336 | 100.00% | |
| Republican hold | | | | |

=== Nebraska (special) ===
Nebraska special election
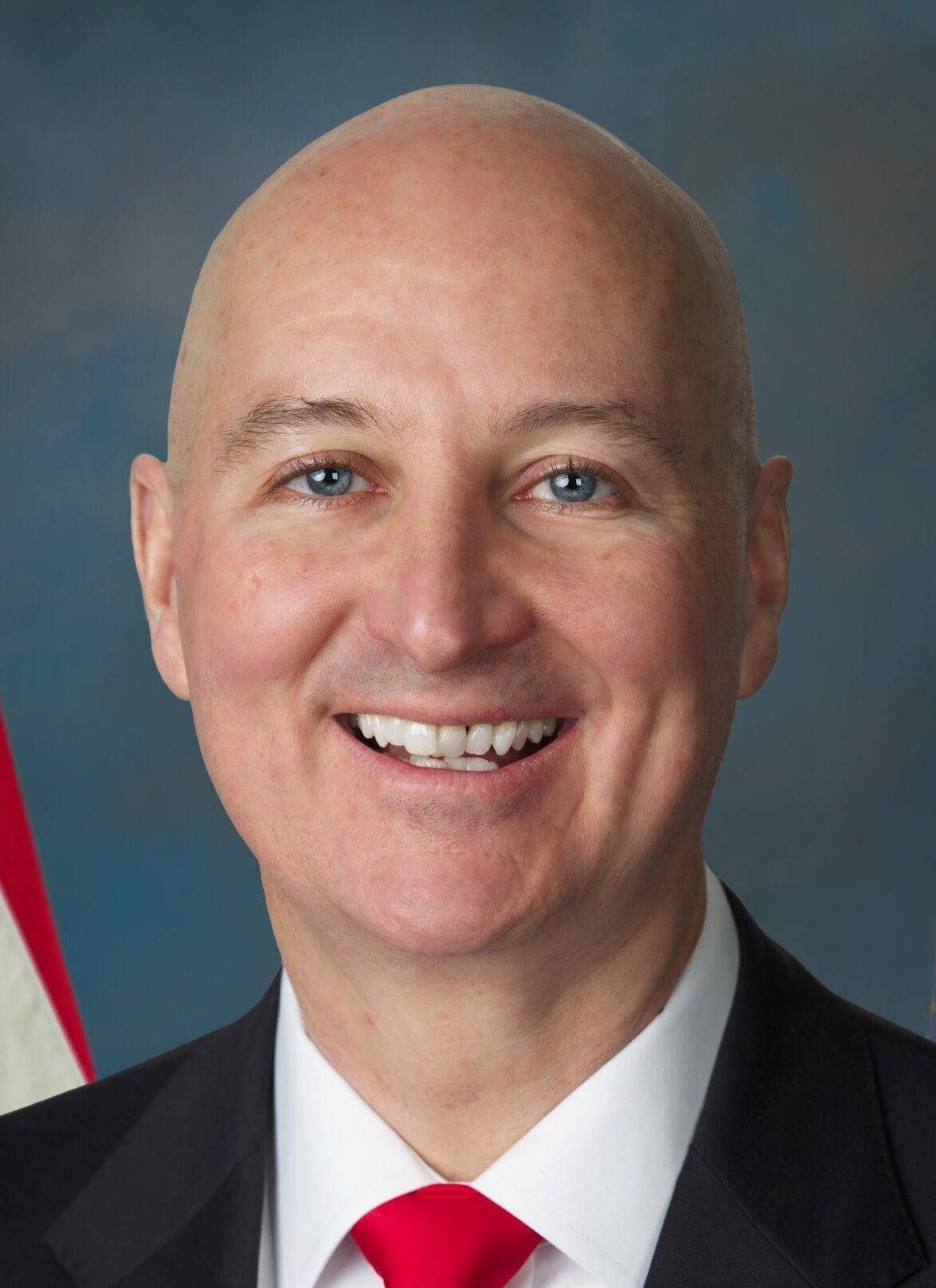

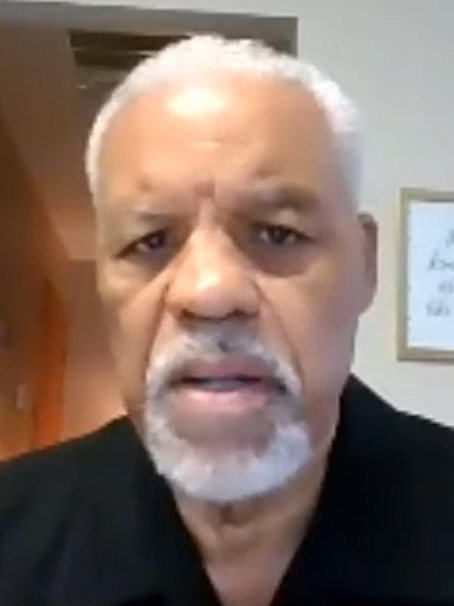
| Nominee | Pete Ricketts | Preston Love Jr. |
| Party | Republican | Democratic |
| Popular vote | 585,103 | 349,902 |
| Percentage | 62.6% | 37.4% |
- County results Ricketts: 50–60% 60–70% 70–80% 80–90% >90% Love: 50–60%
U.S. senator before election
Pete Ricketts
Republican
Elected U.S. senator
Pete Ricketts
Republican

Two-term Republican Ben Sasse resigned his seat on January 8, 2023, to become president of the University of Florida. Former governor and 2006 Senate nominee Pete Ricketts was appointed by Governor Jim Pillen, and a special election for the seat would take place concurrently with the 2024 regular Senate elections. Ricketts defeated Air Force veteran John Glen Weaver for the Republican nomination. Former University of Nebraska Omaha professor Preston Love Jr. ran as a Democrat.

Rickets won the election, securing over 62% of the vote.

Republican primary results
| Party | Candidate | Votes | % |
|---|---|---|---|
| Republican | Pete Ricketts (incumbent) | 173,118 | 78.16% |
| Republican | John Glen Weaver | 32,529 | 14.69% |
| Republican | Mac Stevens | 13,669 | 6.17% |
| Total votes | | 219,316 | 100.00% |

2024 United States Senate special election in Nebraska
| Party | Candidate | Votes | % | ±% |
|---|---|---|---|---|
| Republican | Pete Ricketts (incumbent) | 585,103 | 62.58% | −0.16% |
| Democratic | Preston Love Jr. | 349,902 | 37.42% | +12.99% |
| Total votes | | 935,005 | 100.0% | |
| Republican hold | | | | |

== Nevada ==
Nevada election
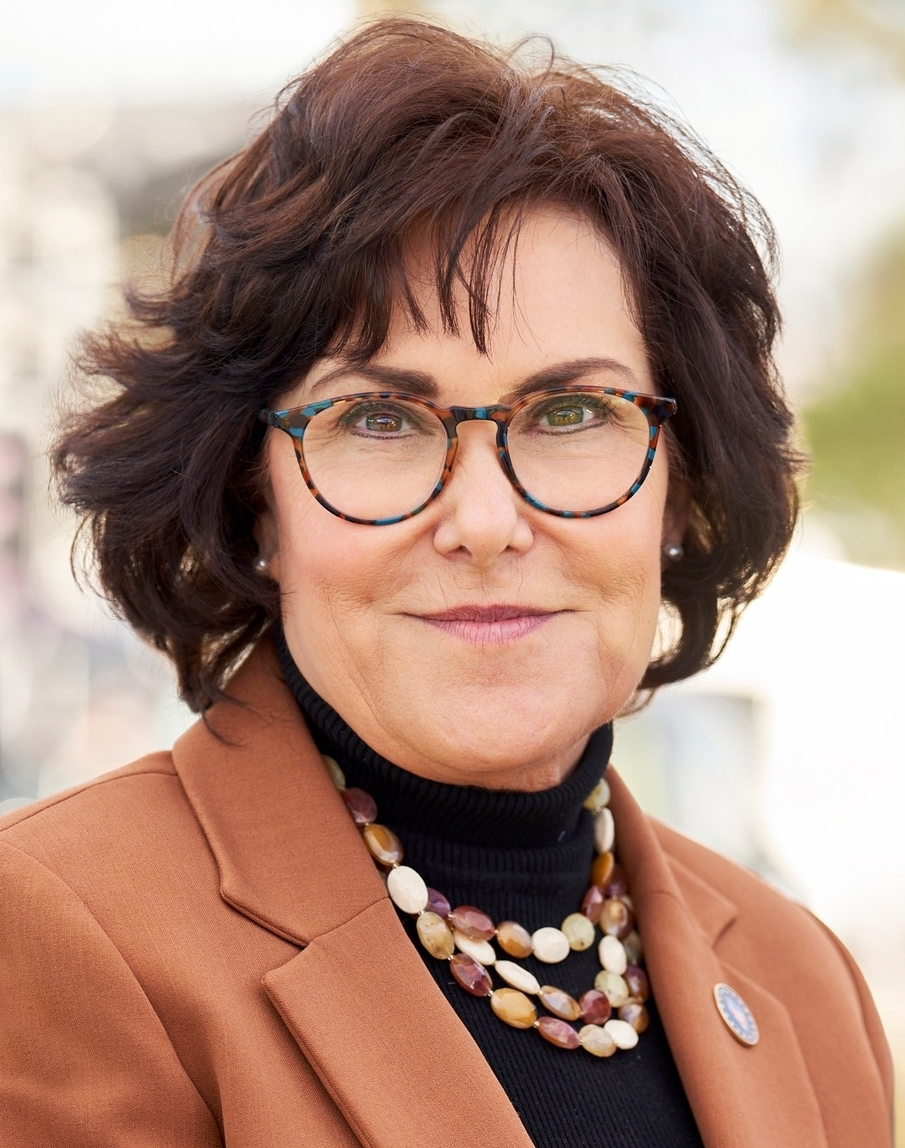

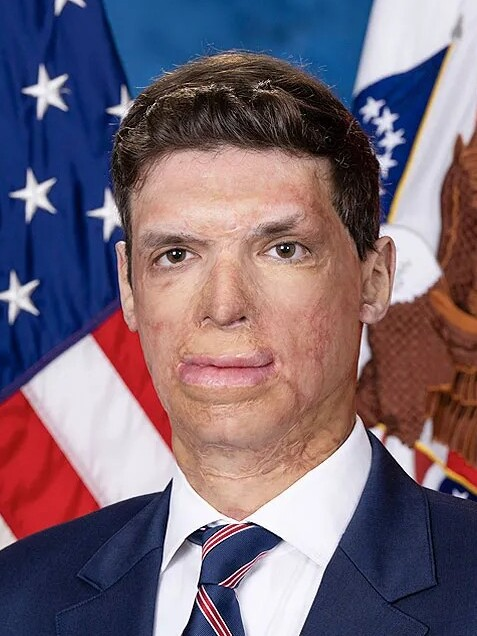
| Nominee | Jacky Rosen | Sam Brown |
| Party | Democratic | Republican |
| Popular vote | 701,105 | 677,046 |
| Percentage | 47.87% | 46.22% |
- County results Rosen: 50–60% Brown: 40–50% 50–60% 60–70% 70–80% 80–90%
U.S. senator before election
Jacky Rosen
Democratic
Elected U.S. senator
Jacky Rosen
Democratic

One-term Democrat Jacky Rosen was elected in 2018 with 50.4% of the vote. Rosen was re-elected for a second term. Veteran and 2022 Senate candidate Sam Brown was declared the Republican nominee after winning the June 11 primary. Brown easily won against former ambassador to Iceland Jeffrey Ross Gunter and former state assemblyman Jim Marchant, among others.

Rosen was reelected by a very slim margin of around 1.7%, an advantage of around 24,000 votes among over 1.46 million cast statewide. This result reflected a somewhat more competitive result than expected, according to final polling averages, and was down from her 2018 margin of around 5 points against then-incumbent Republican senator Dean Heller. Rosen received 47.9% of the statewide vote to Brown's 46.2%.

Democratic primary results
| Party | Candidate | Votes | % |
|---|---|---|---|
| Democratic | Jacky Rosen (incumbent) | 144,090 | 91.51% |
| Democratic | Troy Zakari Walker | 5,899 | 3.75% |
| Democratic | None of These Candidates | 3,951 | 2.51% |
| Democratic | Mike Schaefer | 3,521 | 2.24% |
| Total votes | | 157,461 | 100.0% |

Republican primary results
| Party | Candidate | Votes | % |
|---|---|---|---|
| Republican | Sam Brown | 103,102 | 60.17% |
| Republican | Jeffrey Ross Gunter | 24,987 | 14.58% |
| Republican | Jim Marchant | 11,190 | 6.53% |
| Republican | Tony Grady Jr. | 9,565 | 5.58% |
| Republican | None of These Candidates | 7,164 | 4.18% |
| Republican | William Conrad | 6,038 | 3.52% |
| Republican | Stephanie Phillips | 3,828 | 2.23% |
| Republican | Garn Mabey | 1,818 | 1.06% |
| Republican | Ronda Kennedy | 1,786 | 1.04% |
| Republican | Barry Lindemann | 852 | 0.50% |
| Republican | Edward Hamilton | 478 | 0.28% |
| Republican | Vincent Rego | 311 | 0.18% |
| Republican | Gary Marinch | 231 | 0.13% |
| Total votes | | 171,350 | 100.0% |

2024 United States Senate election in Nevada
| Party | Candidate | Votes | % | ±% |
|---|---|---|---|---|
| Democratic | Jacky Rosen (incumbent) | 701,105 | 47.87% | −2.54% |
| Republican | Sam Brown | 677,046 | 46.22% | +0.84% |
| None of These Candidates | | 44,380 | 3.03% | +1.46% |
| Independent American | Janine Hansen | 21,316 | 1.46% | +0.73% |
| Libertarian | Chris Cunningham | 20,881 | 1.43% | +0.48% |
| Total votes | | 1,464,728 | 100.00% | N/A |
| Democratic hold | | | | |

== New Jersey ==
New Jersey election
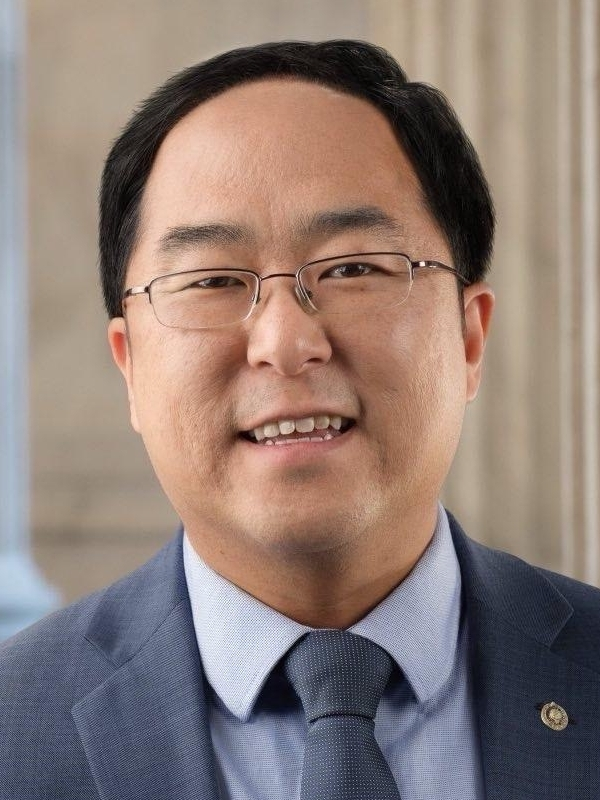

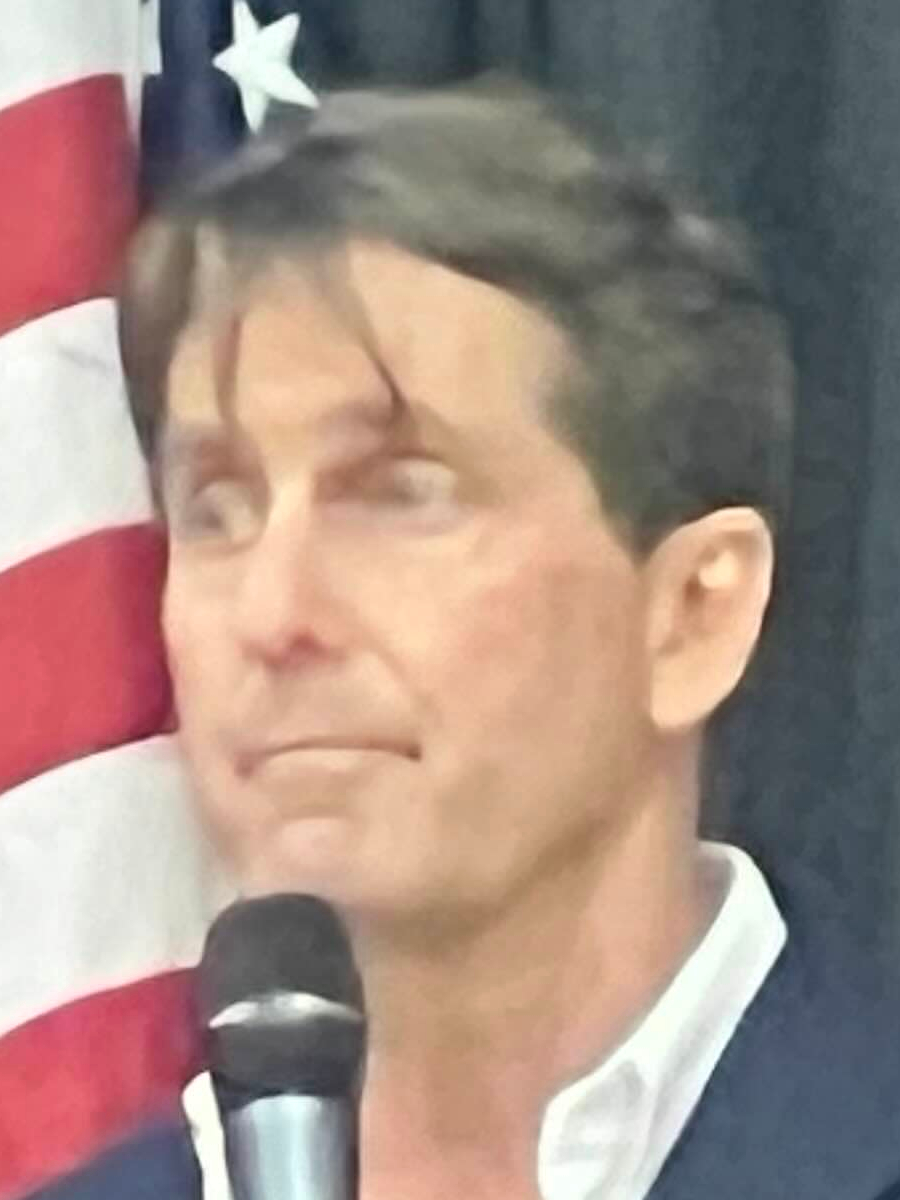
| Nominee | Andy Kim | Curtis Bashaw |
| Party | Democratic | Republican |
| Popular vote | 2,161,491 | 1,773,589 |
| Percentage | 53.61% | 43.99% |
- Kim: 40–50% 50–60% 60–70% 70–80% 80–90% >90% Bashaw: 40–50% 50–60% 60–70% 70–80% 80–90%
U.S. senator before election
George Helmy
Democratic
Elected U.S. senator
Andy Kim
Democratic

Democrat Bob Menendez was reelected in 2018 with 54.0% of the vote. On July 13, 2021, The New Jersey Globe reported that Menendez planned to run for a fourth full term. On September 22, 2023, Menendez was indicted on federal bribery charges. On March 14, 2024, a week after his planned retirement, Menendez reversed his decision and attempted to run for re-election as an Independent candidate. Following his conviction on July 16, he announced that he would resign on August 20 and suspend his candidacy. Governor Phil Murphy announced that day he would appoint George Helmy, his former chief of staff, to serve as the caretaker before the election.

Financier and current first lady of New Jersey Tammy Murphy also ran for the Democratic nomination, but ended her campaign in March 2024. Mendham mayor Christine Serrano Glassner and real estate developer Curtis Bashaw ran for the Republican nomination. On June 4, 2024, Bashaw won the Republican primary in an upset.

Kim won the election with 53% of the vote.

Democratic primary results
| Party | Candidate | Votes | % |
|---|---|---|---|
| Democratic | Andy Kim | 392,602 | 74.83% |
| Democratic | Patricia Campos-Medina | 84,286 | 16.06% |
| Democratic | Lawrence Hamm | 47,796 | 9.11% |
| Total votes | | 524,684 | 100.0% |

Republican primary results
| Party | Candidate | Votes | % |
|---|---|---|---|
| Republican | Curtis Bashaw | 144,869 | 45.57% |
| Republican | Christine Serrano Glassner | 121,986 | 38.38% |
| Republican | Justin Murphy | 35,954 | 11.31% |
| Republican | Albert Harshaw | 15,064 | 4.74% |
| Total votes | | 317,873 | 100.0% |

2024 United States Senate election in New Jersey
| Party | Candidate | Votes | % | ±% |
|---|---|---|---|---|
| Democratic | Andy Kim | 2,161,491 | 53.61% | −0.40% |
| Republican | Curtis Bashaw | 1,773,589 | 43.99% | +1.16% |
| Green | Christina Khalil | 45,443 | 1.13% | +0.34% |
| Libertarian | Kenneth Kaplan | 24,242 | 0.60% | −0.07% |
| Vote Better | Patricia Mooneyham | 17,224 | 0.43% | N/A |
| Socialist Workers | Joanne Kuniansky | 9,806 | 0.24% | N/A |
| Total votes | | 4,031,795 | 100.00% | N/A |
| Democratic hold | | | | |

== New Mexico ==
New Mexico election
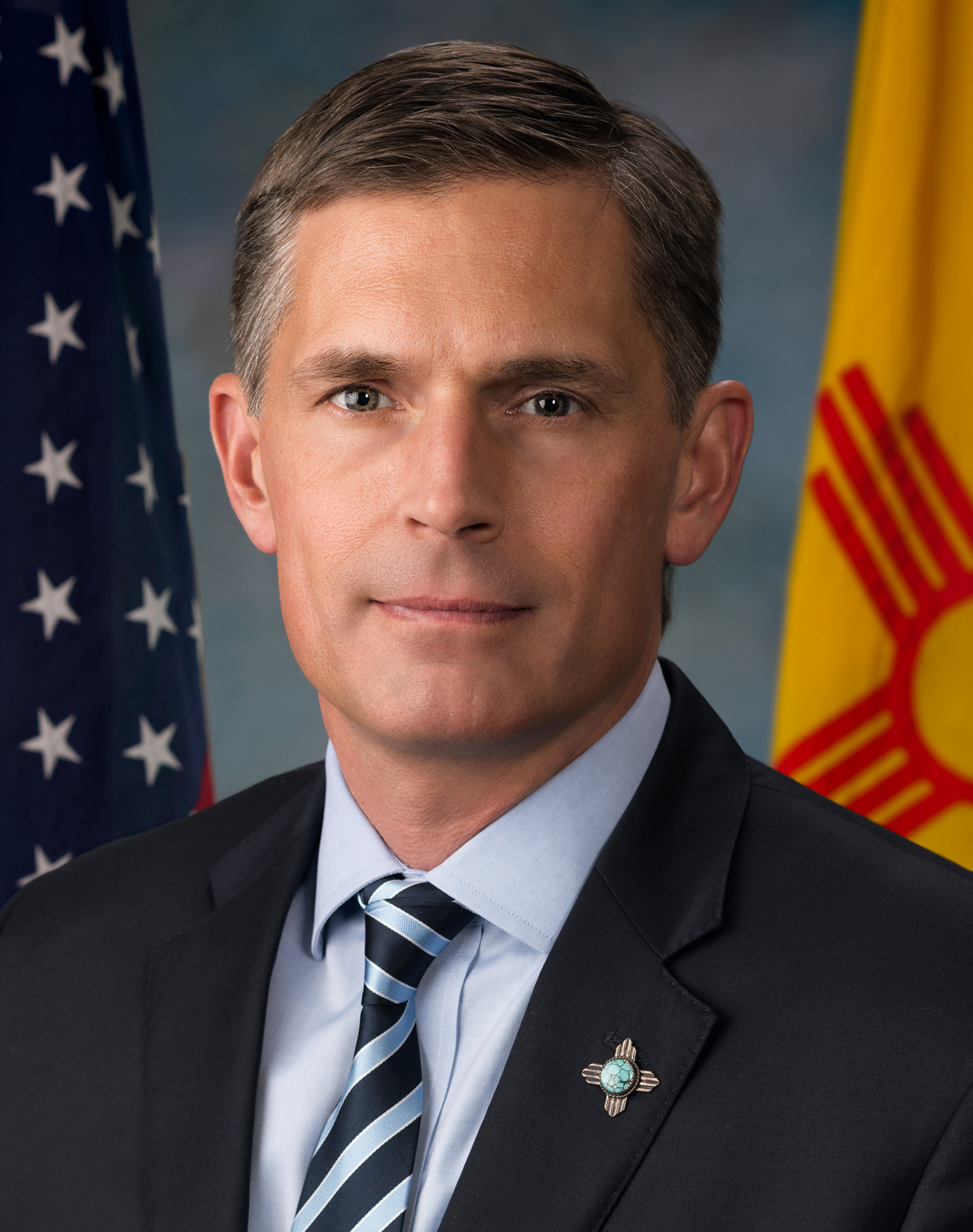

| Nominee | Martin Heinrich | Nella Domenici |
| Party | Democratic | Republican |
| Popular vote | 497,333 | 405,978 |
| Percentage | 55.06% | 44.94% |
- County results Heinrich: 50–60% 60–70% 70–80% Domenici: 50–60% 60–70% 70–80%
U.S. senator before election
Martin Heinrich
Democratic
Elected U.S. Senator
Martin Heinrich
Democratic

Two-term Democrat Martin Heinrich was reelected in 2018 with 54.1% of the vote in a three-candidate race. He was re-elected for a third term. Hedge fund executive Nella Domenici, daughter of Pete Domenici, senator from 1973 to 2009, announced her candidacy for the Republican nomination on January 17, 2024.

Henrich won re-election to a third term in office by 10.12%, receiving 55.1% of the statewide vote to Domenici's 44.9%.

2024 United States Senate election in New Mexico
| Party | Candidate | Votes | % | ±% |
|---|---|---|---|---|
| Democratic | Martin Heinrich (incumbent) | 497,333 | 55.06% | +0.97% |
| Republican | Nella Domenici | 405,978 | 44.94% | +14.41% |
| Total votes | | 903,311 | 100.00% | N/A |
| Democratic hold | | | | |

== New York ==
New York election
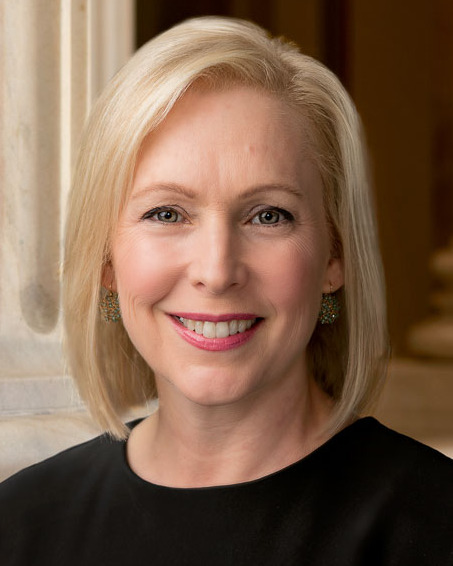

| Nominee | Kirsten Gillibrand | Mike Sapraicone |
| Party | Democratic | Republican |
| Alliance | Working Families | Conservative |
| Popular vote | 4,711,298 | 3,246,114 |
| Percentage | 58.91% | 40.59% |
- County results Gillibrand: 50–60% 60–70% 70–80% 80–90% Sapraicone: 50–60% 60–70% 70–80%
U.S. senator before election
Kirsten Gillibrand
Democratic
Elected U.S. senator
Kirsten Gillibrand
Democratic

Two-term Democrat Kirsten Gillibrand was reelected in 2018 with 67.0% of the vote. She was re-elected for a third full term. Former New York City Police detective Mike Sapraicone declared his candidacy as a Republican. Both Gillibrand and Sapraicone won their respective primaries unopposed.

Gillibrand's victory of 18 points was significantly closer than her previous two, and followed Chuck Schumer's narrower victory in 2022. This was the state's second consecutive Senate election in which the Republican garnered over 40% of the vote.

2024 United States Senate election in New York
| Party | Candidate | Votes | % | ±% |
|---|---|---|---|---|
| Democratic | Kirsten Gillibrand | 4,318,903 | 53.91% | −8.07% |
| Working Families | Kirsten Gillibrand | 392,395 | 4.89% | +2.25% |
| Total | Kirsten Gillibrand (incumbent) | 4,711,298 | 58.82% | –8.14% |
| Republican | Mike Sapraicone | 2,917,044 | 36.42% | +7.86% |
| Conservative | Mike Sapraicone | 329,070 | 4.11% | +0.05% |
| Total | Mike Sapraicone | 3,246,114 | 40.52% | +7.54% |
| LaRouche | Diane Sare | 39,413 | 0.49% | N/A |
| Write ins | Write ins | 13,492 | 0.17% | |
| Total votes | | 8,010,317 | 100.00% | N/A |
| Democratic hold | | | | |

== North Dakota ==
North Dakota election
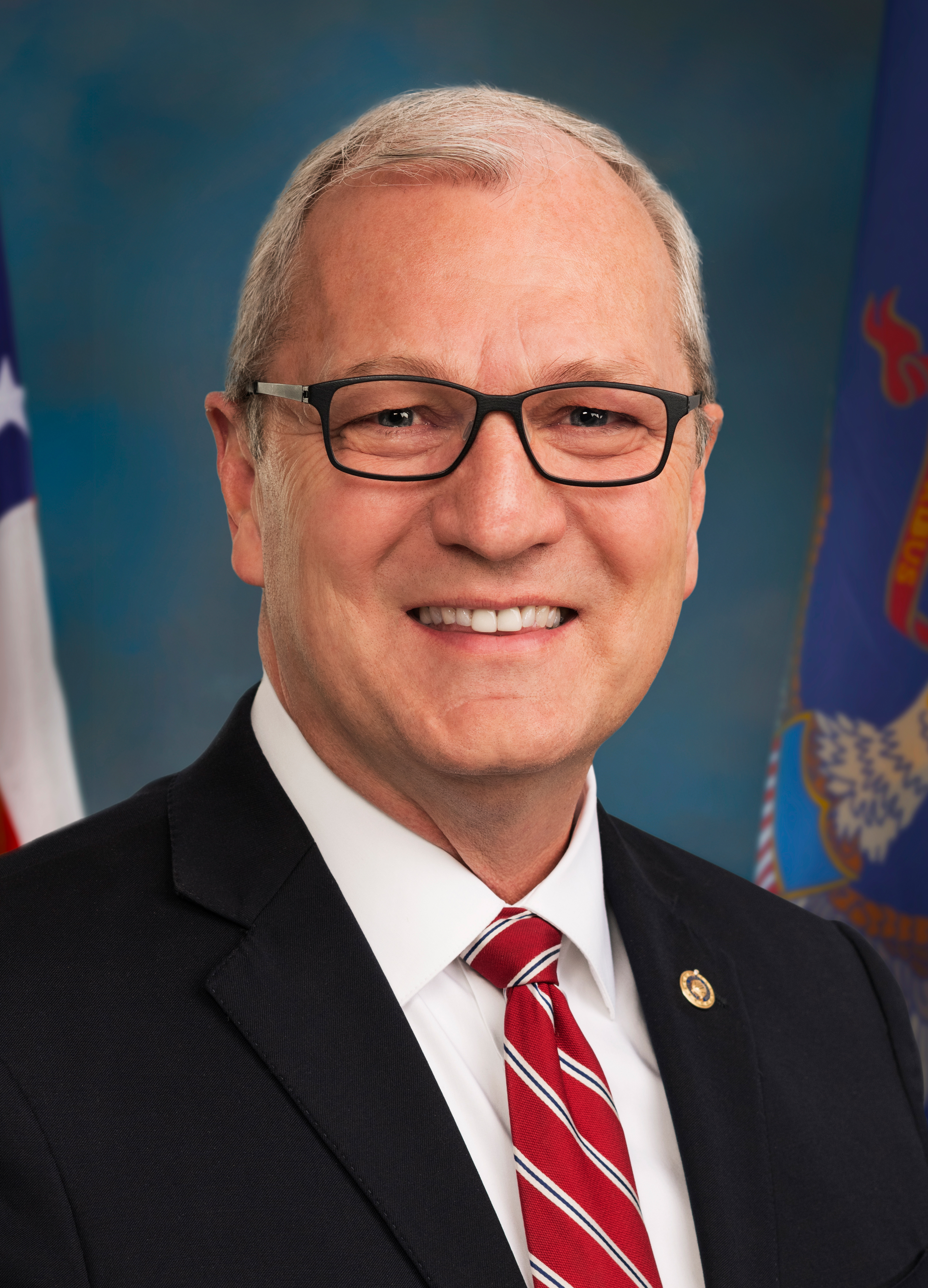

| Nominee | Kevin Cramer | Katrina Christiansen |
| Party | Republican | Democratic–NPL |
| Popular vote | 241,569 | 121,602 |
| Percentage | 66.31% | 33.38% |
- County results Cramer: 50–60% 60–70% 70–80% 80–90% Christiansen: 60–70% 70–80%
U.S. senator before election
Kevin Cramer
Republican
Elected U.S. senator
Kevin Cramer
Republican

One-term Republican Kevin Cramer was elected in 2018 with 55.1% of the vote. Cramer ran for re-election. Democrat Katrina Christiansen, an engineering professor from the University of Jamestown and candidate for the Senate in 2022, was her party's nominee.

Cramer won the election by over 66% of the vote and he more than tripled his margin from 2018 and won 10 counties he lost in 2018.

2024 United States Senate election in North Dakota
| Party | Candidate | Votes | % | ±% |
|---|---|---|---|---|
| Republican | Kevin Cramer (incumbent) | 241,569 | 66.31% | +11.20% |
| Democratic–NPL | Katrina Christiansen | 121,602 | 33.38% | −10.89% |
| Write-in | | 1,156 | 0.32% | -0.31% |
| Total votes | | 364,327 | 100.00% | N/A |
| Republican hold | | | | |

== Ohio ==
Ohio election
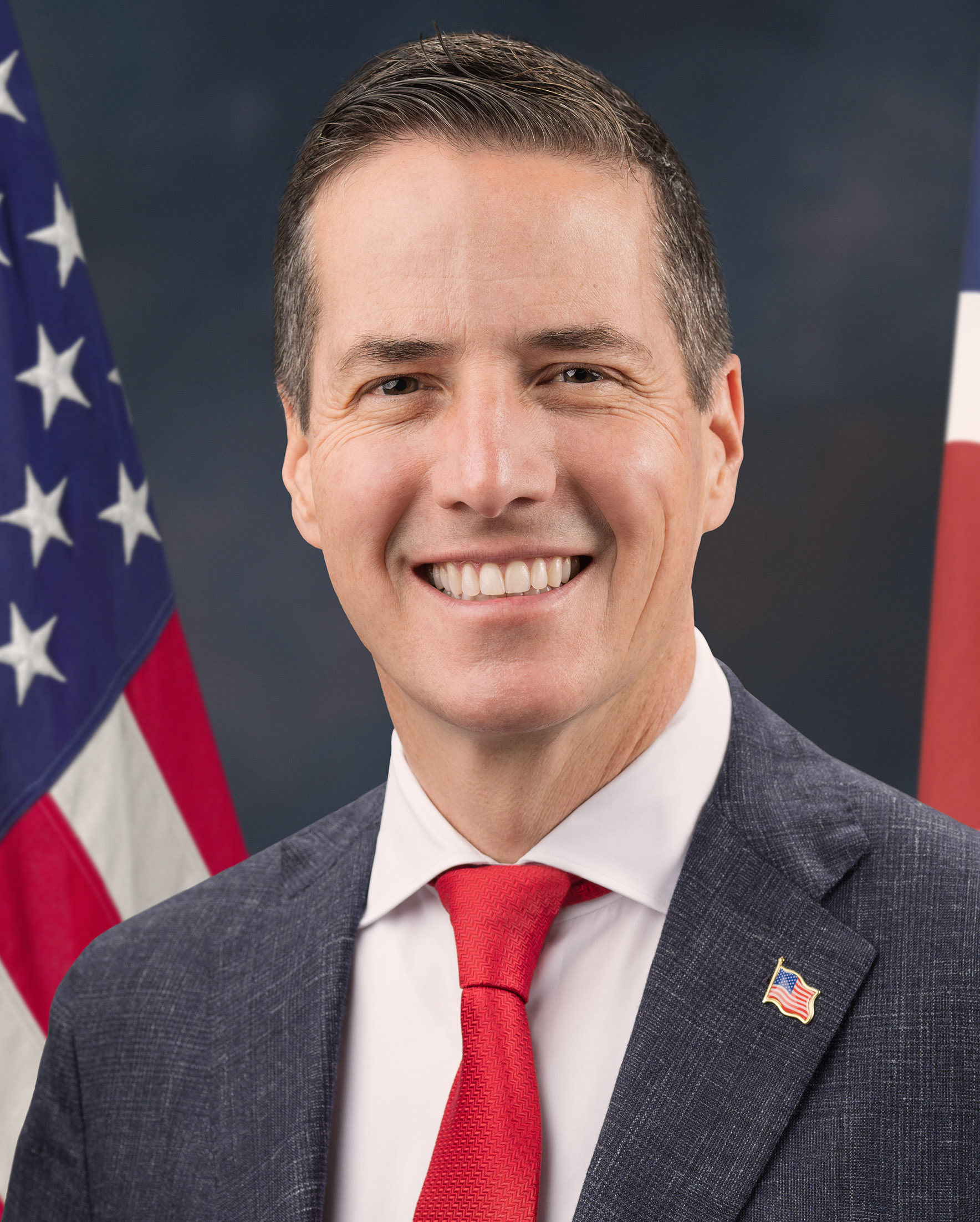

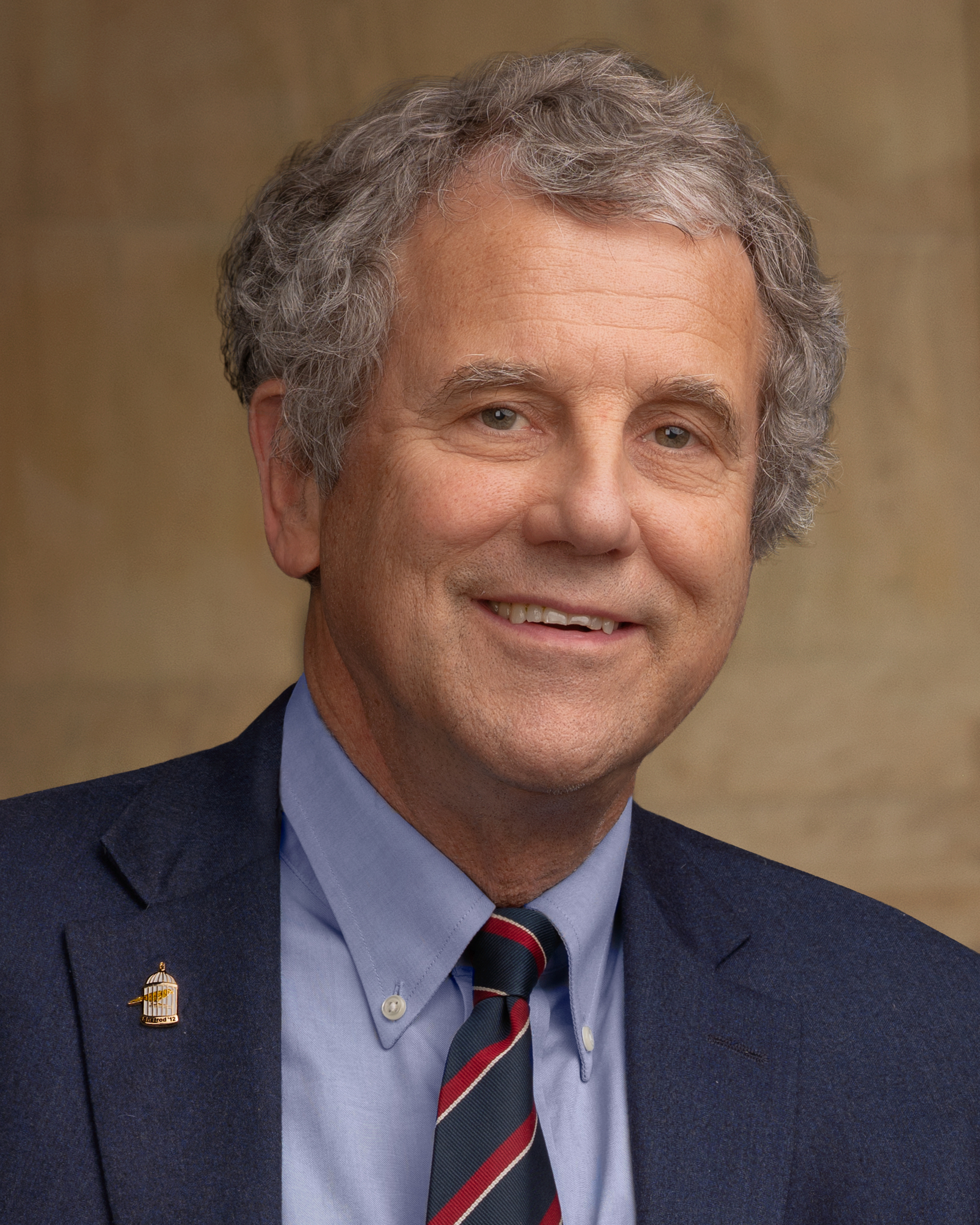
| Nominee | Bernie Moreno | Sherrod Brown |
| Party | Republican | Democratic |
| Popular vote | 2,857,383 | 2,650,949 |
| Percentage | 50.09% | 46.47% |
- County results Moreno: 40–50% 50–60% 60–70% 70–80% Brown: 40–50% 50–60% 60–70%
U.S. senator before election
Sherrod Brown
Democratic
Elected U.S. Senator
Bernie Moreno
Republican

Three-term Democrat Sherrod Brown was reelected in 2018 with 53.4% of the vote. Brown ran for a fourth term. He was one of two Democratic senators running for reelection who represented states won by Republican Donald Trump in both the 2016 and 2020 presidential elections. The Republican nominee was businessman Bernie Moreno, who defeated state senator Matt Dolan and secretary of state Frank LaRose in the primary election.

Moreno defeated Brown in the general election 50.1% to 46.5%, flipping the seat for the Republicans. Brown had the second worst performance of a Democratic incumbent in 2024, behind only Montana senator Jon Tester.

Republican primary results
| Party | Candidate | Votes | % |
|---|---|---|---|
| Republican | Bernie Moreno | 557,626 | 50.48% |
| Republican | Matt Dolan | 363,013 | 32.86% |
| Republican | Frank LaRose | 184,111 | 16.67% |
| Total votes | | 1,104,750 | 100.0% |

2024 United States Senate election in Ohio
| Party | Candidate | Votes | % | ±% |
|---|---|---|---|---|
| Republican | Bernie Moreno | 2,857,383 | 50.09% | +3.51% |
| Democratic | Sherrod Brown (incumbent) | 2,650,949 | 46.47% | −6.93% |
| Libertarian | Don Kissick | 195,648 | 3.43% | +3.43% |
| Write-in | | 640 | 0.01% | -0.01% |
| Total votes | | 5,704,620 | 100.00% | |
| Turnout | | | 69.91% | +15.26 |
| Republican gain from Democratic | | | | |

== Pennsylvania ==
Pennsylvania election
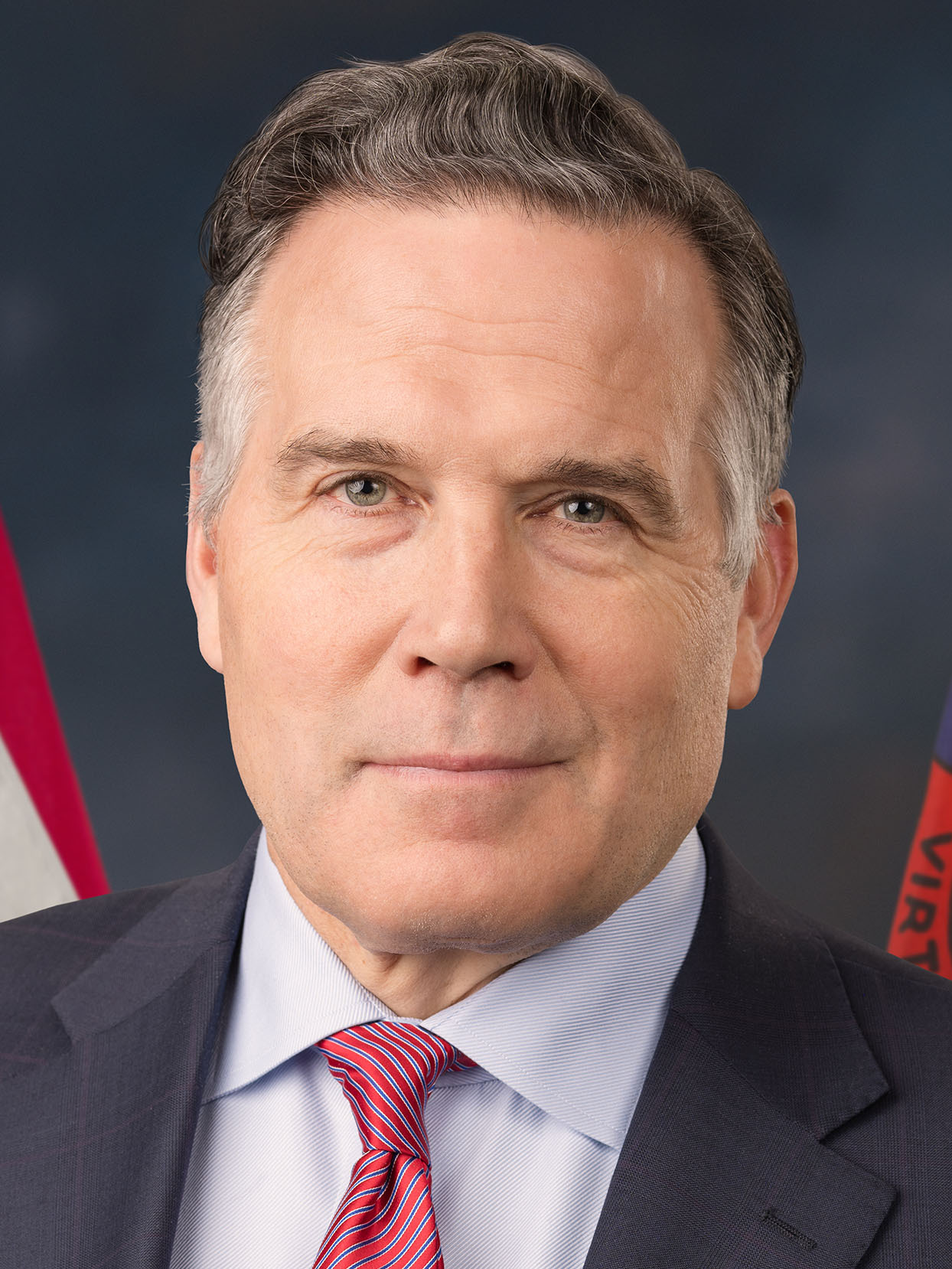

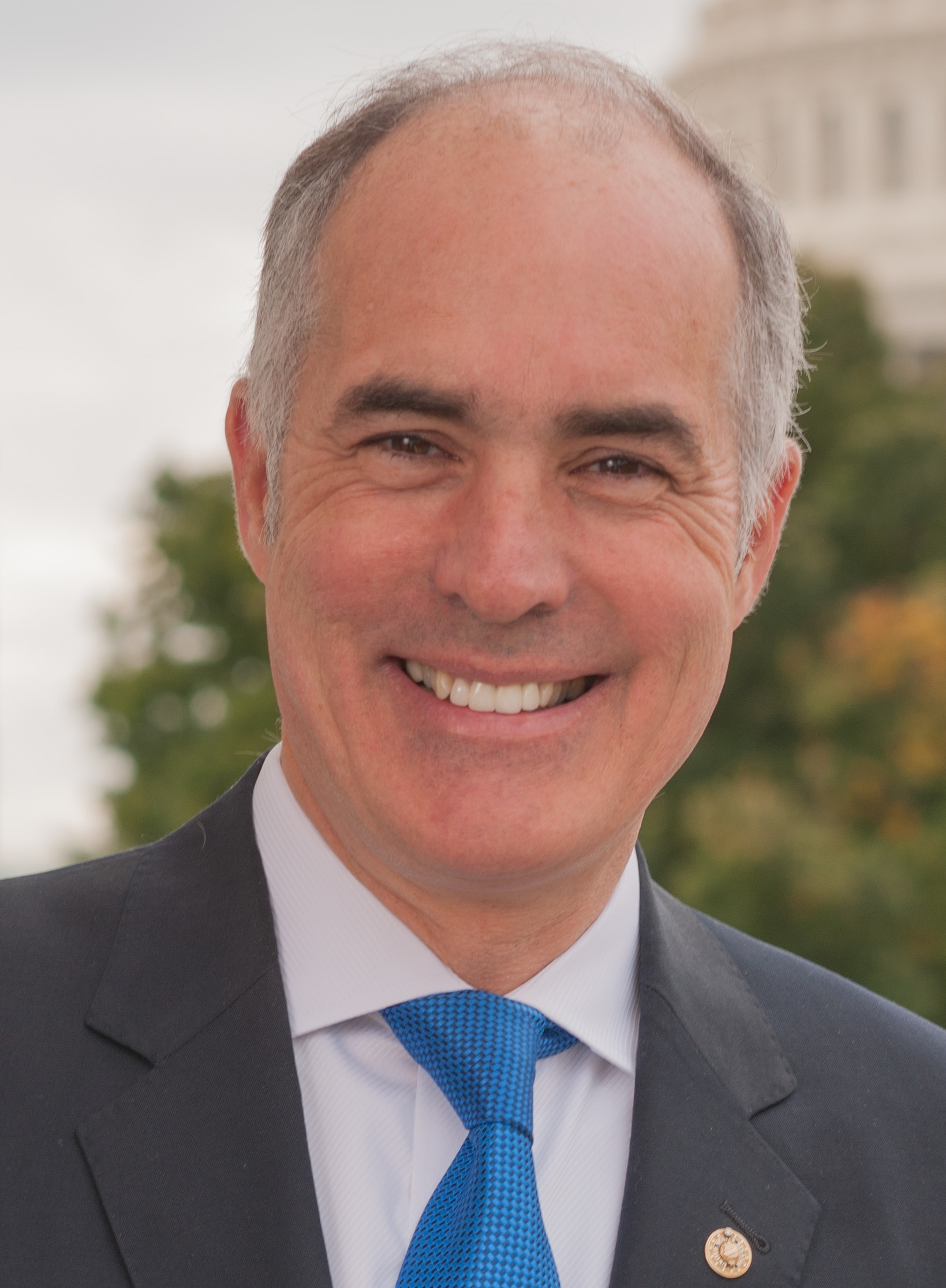
| Nominee | David McCormick | Bob Casey Jr. |
| Party | Republican | Democratic |
| Popular vote | 3,399,295 | 3,384,180 |
| Percentage | 48.82% | 48.60% |
- County results McCormick: 40–50% 50–60% 60–70% 70–80% 80–90% Casey: 40–50% 50–60% 60–70% 70–80%
U.S. senator before election
Bob Casey Jr.
Democratic
Elected U.S. Senator
David McCormick
Republican

Three-term Democrat Bob Casey Jr., was reelected in 2018 with 55.7% of the vote. Casey was running for a fourth term. He was challenged by engineer Blaine Forkner.

2022 Senate candidate David McCormick was the Republican nominee. McCormick won from Casey by 48.8% to 48.6% in the general election in a major upset, as most predictions gave Casey a slight advantage, and he led in most polls. Initially, despite the Associated Press calling the race for McCormick, Casey refused to concede the race due to unknown numbers of outstanding provisional ballots in primarily urban areas. Senate majority leader Chuck Schumer originally did not invite McCormick to the "New Senator Orientation Event," but Schumer relented after criticism from Republicans and independent Arizona senator Kyrsten Sinema. Casey eventually conceded on November 21; McCormick was then officially declared the winner.

2024 United States Senate election in Pennsylvania
| Party | Candidate | Votes | % | ±% |
|---|---|---|---|---|
| Republican | Dave McCormick | 3,399,295 | 48.82% | +6.20% |
| Democratic | Bob Casey Jr. (incumbent) | 3,384,180 | 48.60% | −7.14% |
| Libertarian | John Thomas | 89,653 | 1.29% | +0.27% |
| Green | Leila Hazou | 66,388 | 0.95% | +0.33% |
| Constitution | Marty Selker | 23,621 | 0.34% | N/A |
| Total votes | | 6,963,137 | 100.0% | |
| Republican gain from Democratic | | | | |

== Rhode Island ==
Rhode Island election
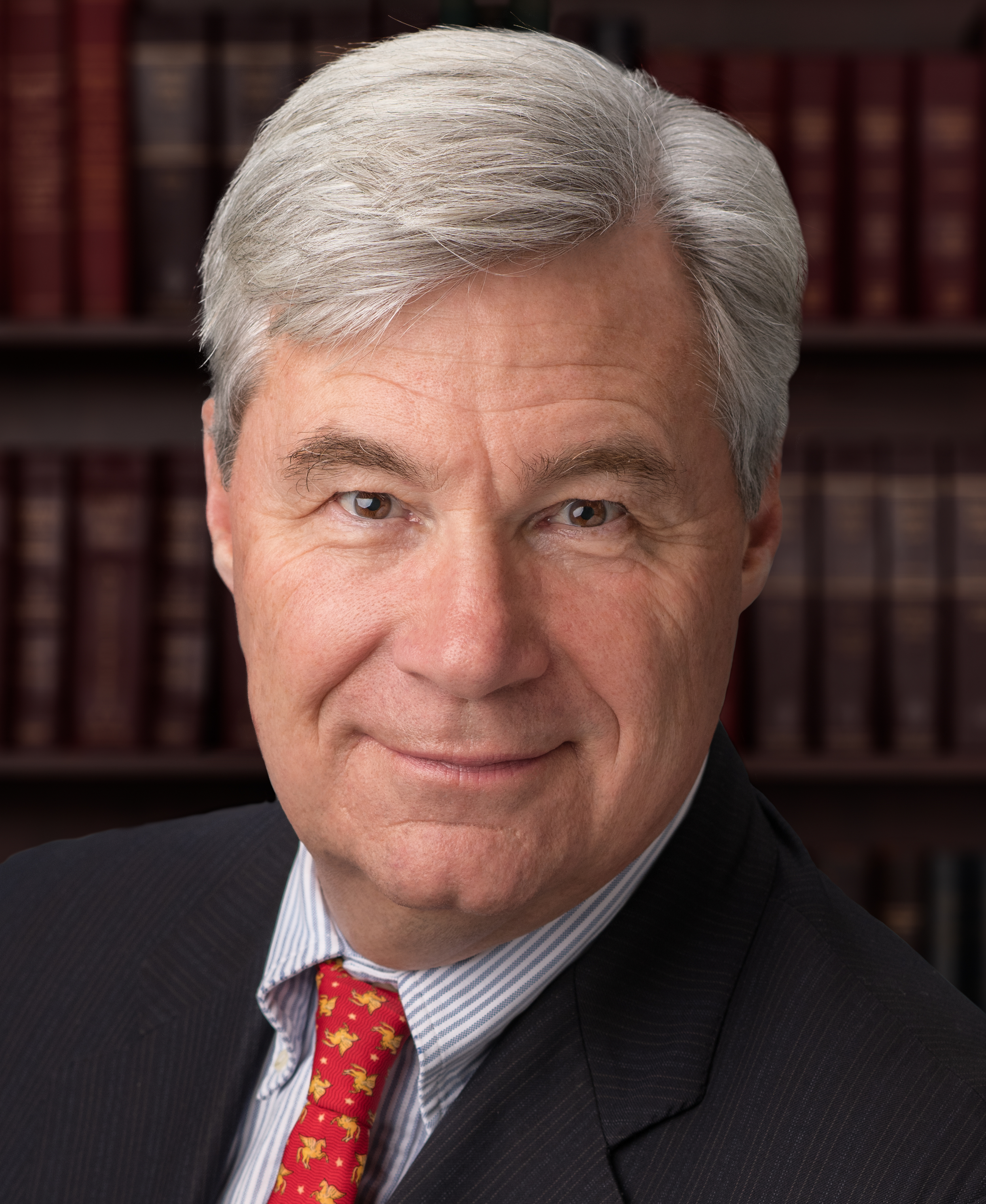

| Nominee | Sheldon Whitehouse | Patricia Morgan |
| Party | Democratic | Republican |
| Popular vote | 294,665 | 196,039 |
| Percentage | 59.90% | 39.85% |
- Whitehouse: 50–60% 60–70% 70–80% Morgan: 50–60%
U.S. senator before election
Sheldon Whitehouse
Democratic
Elected U.S. Senator
Sheldon Whitehouse
Democratic

Three-term Democrat Sheldon Whitehouse was reelected in 2018 with 61.4% of the vote. He ran for a fourth term. Republicans who announced their candidacies included state representative Patricia Morgan and IT professional Raymond McKay.

Sheldon was easily re-elected with 59.9% of the vote.

Democratic primary results
| Party | Candidate | Votes | % |
|---|---|---|---|
| Democratic | Sheldon Whitehouse (incumbent) | 49,401 | 83.77% |
| Democratic | Michael Costa | 9,572 | 16.23% |
| Total votes | | 58,973 | 100.0% |

Republican primary results
| Party | Candidate | Votes | % |
|---|---|---|---|
| Republican | Patricia Morgan | 12,108 | 64.44% |
| Republican | Raymond McKay | 6,681 | 35.56% |
| Total votes | | 18,789 | 100.0% |

2024 United States Senate election in Rhode Island
| Party | Candidate | Votes | % | ±% |
|---|---|---|---|---|
| Democratic | Sheldon Whitehouse (incumbent) | 294,665 | 59.90% | −1.54% |
| Republican | Patricia Morgan | 196,039 | 39.85% | +1.52% |
| Write-in | | 1,244 | 0.25% | +0.03% |
| Total votes | | 491,948 | 100.00% | N/A |
| Democratic hold | | | | |

== Tennessee ==
Tennessee election
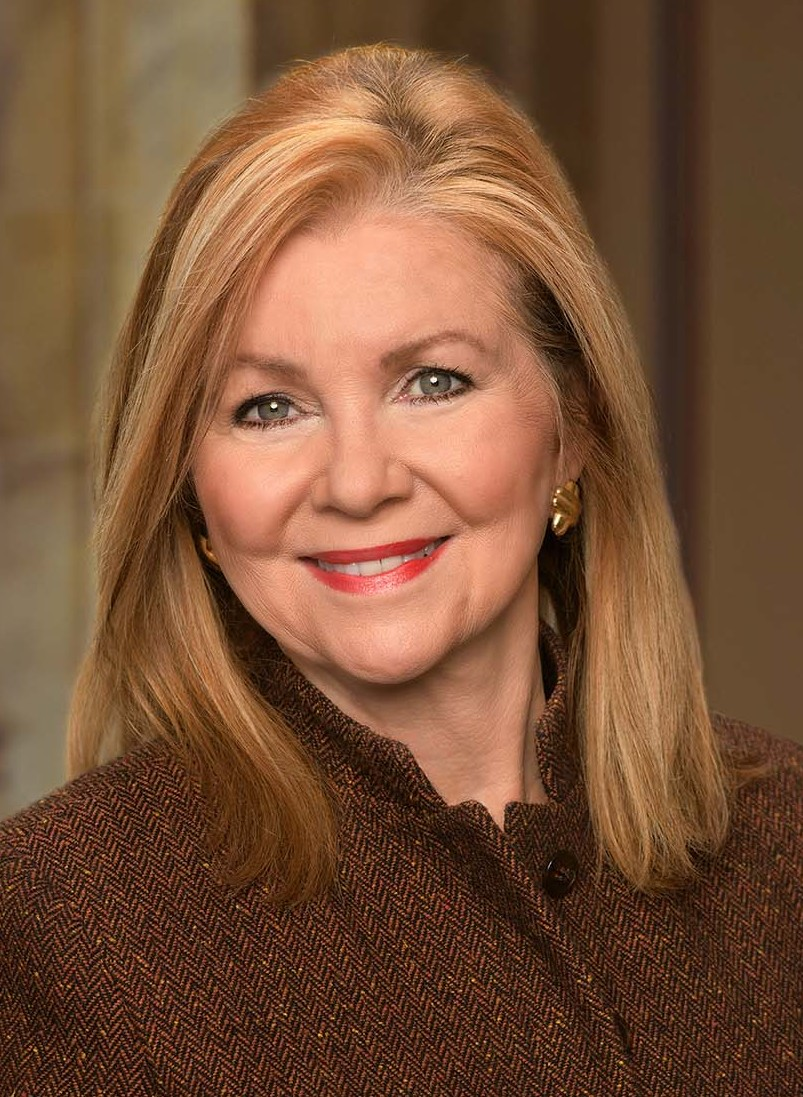

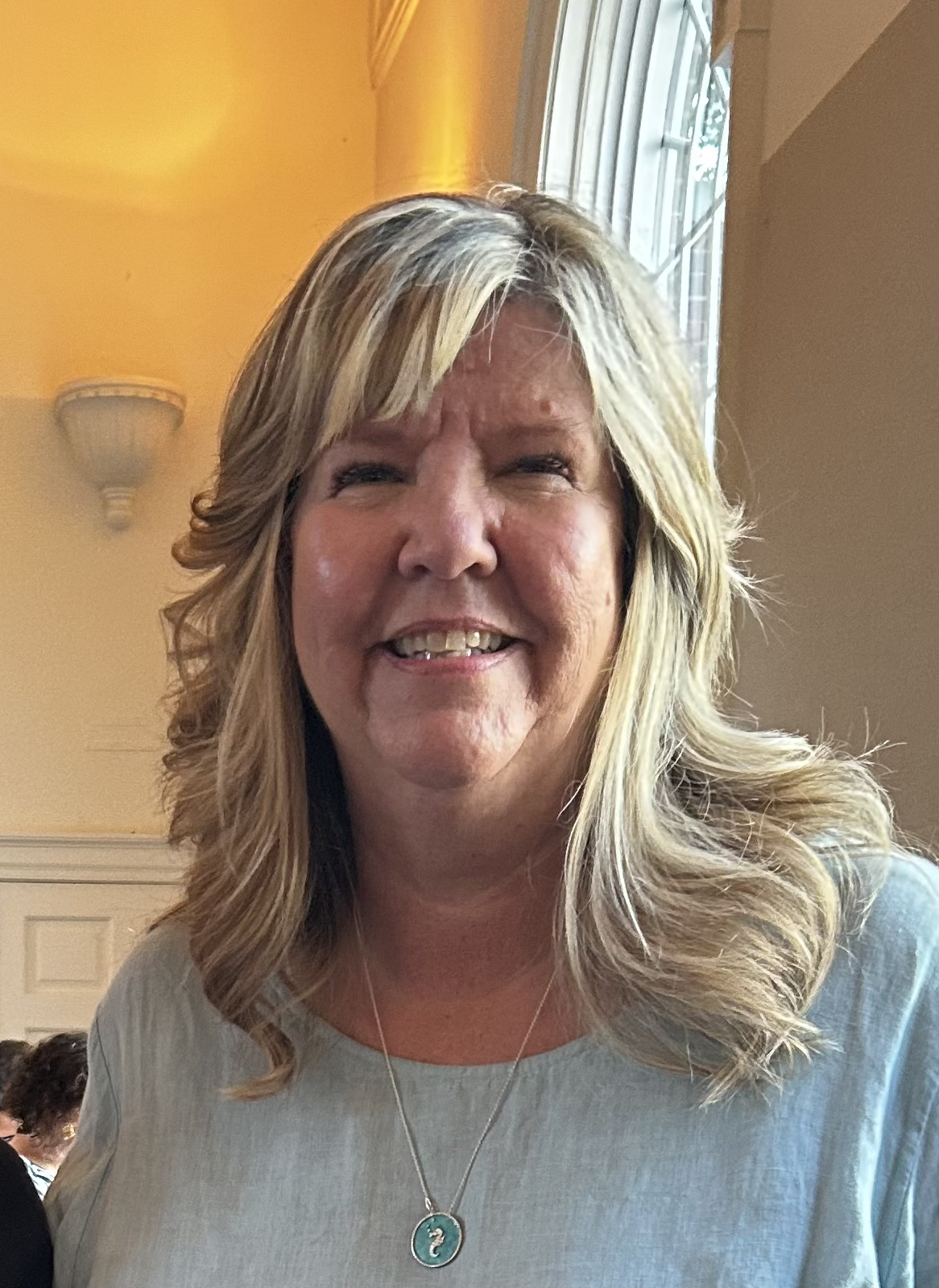
| Nominee | Marsha Blackburn | Gloria Johnson |
| Party | Republican | Democratic |
| Popular vote | 1,918,743 | 1,027,461 |
| Percentage | 63.80% | 34.16% |
- Blackburn: 40–50% 50–60% 60–70% 70–80% 80–90% >90% Johnson: 40–50% 50–60% 60–70% 70–80% 80–90% >90% Tie: 50% No data
U.S. senator before election
Marsha Blackburn
Republican
Elected U.S. senator
Marsha Blackburn
Republican

One-term Republican Marsha Blackburn was elected in 2018 with 54.7% of the vote. Blackburn filed paperwork to run for reelection. The Democratic nominee was state representative Gloria Johnson.

Blackburn defeated Johnson with 63.8% of the vote. Blackburn improved vastly from her 2018 performance by nearly 19 points.

Republican primary results
| Party | Candidate | Votes | % |
|---|---|---|---|
| Republican | Marsha Blackburn (incumbent) | 367,799 | 89.48% |
| Republican | Tres Wittum | 43,244 | 10.52% |
| Write-in | | 2 | <0.01% |
| Total votes | | 411,045 | 100.00% |

Democratic primary results
| Party | Candidate | Votes | % |
|---|---|---|---|
| Democratic | Gloria Johnson | 143,962 | 70.20% |
| Democratic | Marquita Bradshaw | 44,657 | 21.78% |
| Democratic | Lola Brown | 10,027 | 4.89% |
| Democratic | Civil Miller-Watkins | 6,420 | 3.13% |
| Total votes | | 205,066 | 100.00% |

2024 United States Senate election in Tennessee
| Party | Candidate | Votes | % | ±% |
|---|---|---|---|---|
| Republican | Marsha Blackburn (incumbent) | 1,918,743 | 63.80% | +9.09% |
| Democratic | Gloria Johnson | 1,027,461 | 34.16% | −9.76% |
| Independent | Tharon Chandler | 28,444 | 0.95% | N/A |
| Independent | Pamela Moses | 24,682 | 0.82% | N/A |
| Independent | Hastina Robinson | 8,278 | 0.28% | N/A |
| Total votes | | 3,007,608 | 100.00% | |

== Texas ==
Texas election
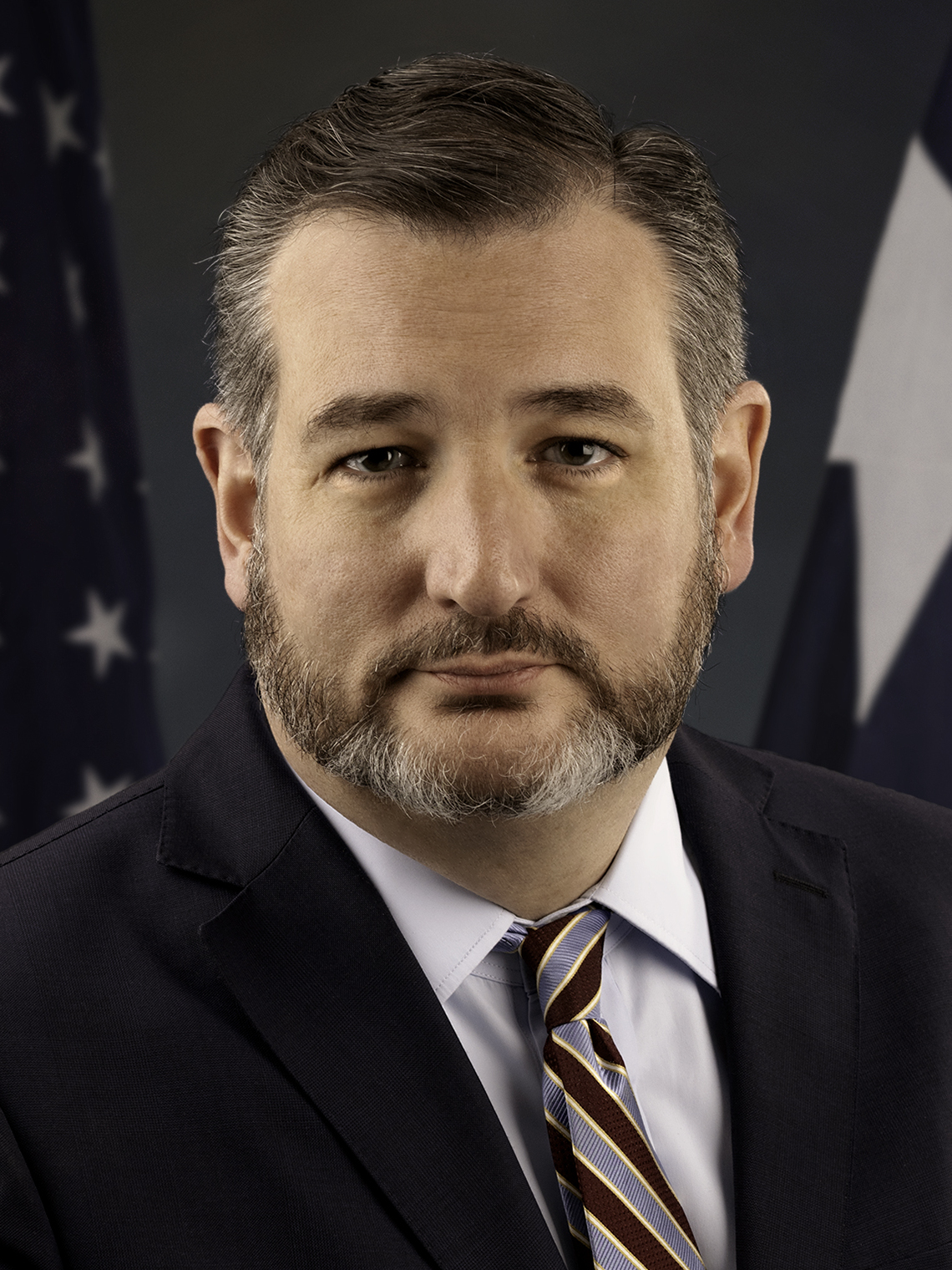

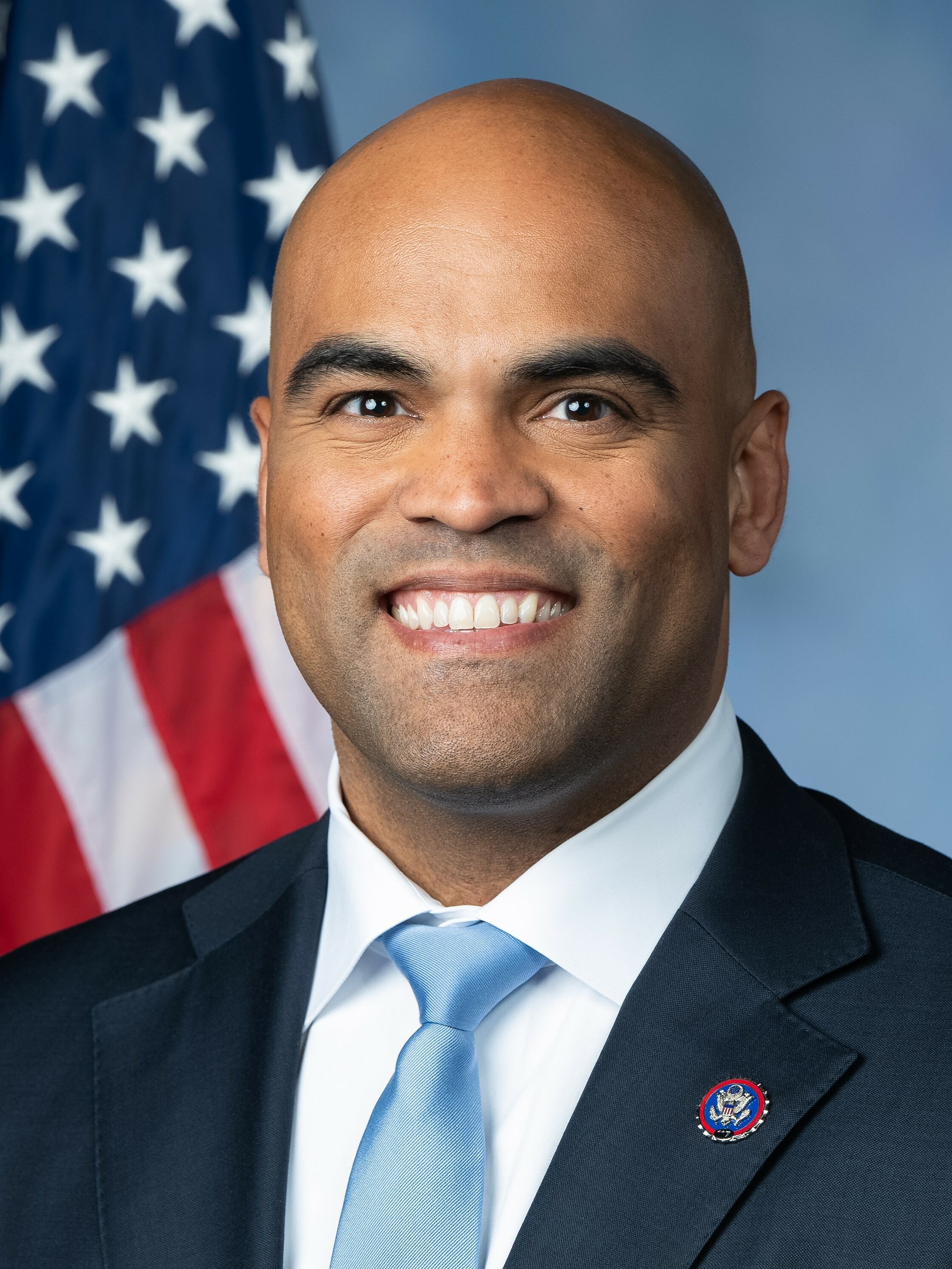
| Nominee | Ted Cruz | Colin Allred |
| Party | Republican | Democratic |
| Popular vote | 5,990,741 | 5,031,249 |
| Percentage | 53.07% | 44.57% |
- County results Cruz: 40–50% 50–60% 60–70% 70–80% 80–90% >90% Allred: 40–50% 50–60% 60–70% 70–80%
U.S. senator before election
Ted Cruz
Republican
Elected U.S. senator
Ted Cruz
Republican

Ted Cruz ran for a third Senate term. He faced Democratic nominee Colin Allred, a former NFL player and congressman, who defeated state senator Roland Gutierrez and state representative Carl Sherman in the primary election. Cruz defeated Allred on November 5, 2024, by 53.1% to 44.6%.

Early polling showed Cruz as a clear favorite, but polls closer to the election showed a closer race. Cruz ultimately outperformed polling and expectations and won re-election by 8.49%, improving on his 2018 margin by six points and flipping thirteen counties. Cruz won a majority of Hispanic and Latino voters, particularly those living on the border with Mexico who had traditionally supported Democratic candidates; the NBC News exit poll showed 52% of Latinos supported Cruz, a 17-point increase from 2018.

Republican primary results
| Party | Candidate | Votes | % |
|---|---|---|---|
| Republican | Ted Cruz (incumbent) | 1,977,961 | 88.30% |
| Republican | Holland Gibson | 134,011 | 5.98% |
| Republican | Rufus Lopez | 127,986 | 5.71% |
| Total votes | | 2,239,958 | 100.00% |

Democratic primary results
| Party | Candidate | Votes | % |
|---|---|---|---|
| Democratic | Colin Allred | 569,585 | 58.87% |
| Democratic | Roland Gutierrez | 160,978 | 16.64% |
| Democratic | Mark Gonzalez | 85,228 | 8.81% |
| Democratic | Meri Gomez | 44,166 | 4.56% |
| Democratic | Carl Sherman | 31,694 | 3.28% |
| Democratic | Robert Hassan | 21,855 | 2.26% |
| Democratic | Steven Keough | 21,801 | 2.25% |
| Democratic | Heli Rodriguez-Prilliman | 18,801 | 1.94% |
| Democratic | Thierry Tchenko | 13,395 | 1.38% |
| Total votes | | 967,503 | 100.00% |

2024 United States Senate election in Texas
| Party | Candidate | Votes | % | ±% |
|---|---|---|---|---|
| Republican | Ted Cruz (incumbent) | 5,990,741 | 53.05% | +2.18% |
| Democratic | Colin Allred | 5,031,249 | 44.56% | −3.76% |
| Libertarian | Ted Brown | 267,039 | 2.36% | +1.59% |
| Write-in | | 2,825 | 0.03% | |
| Total votes | | 11,291,854 | 100.00% | |
| Republican hold | | | | |

== Utah ==
Utah election
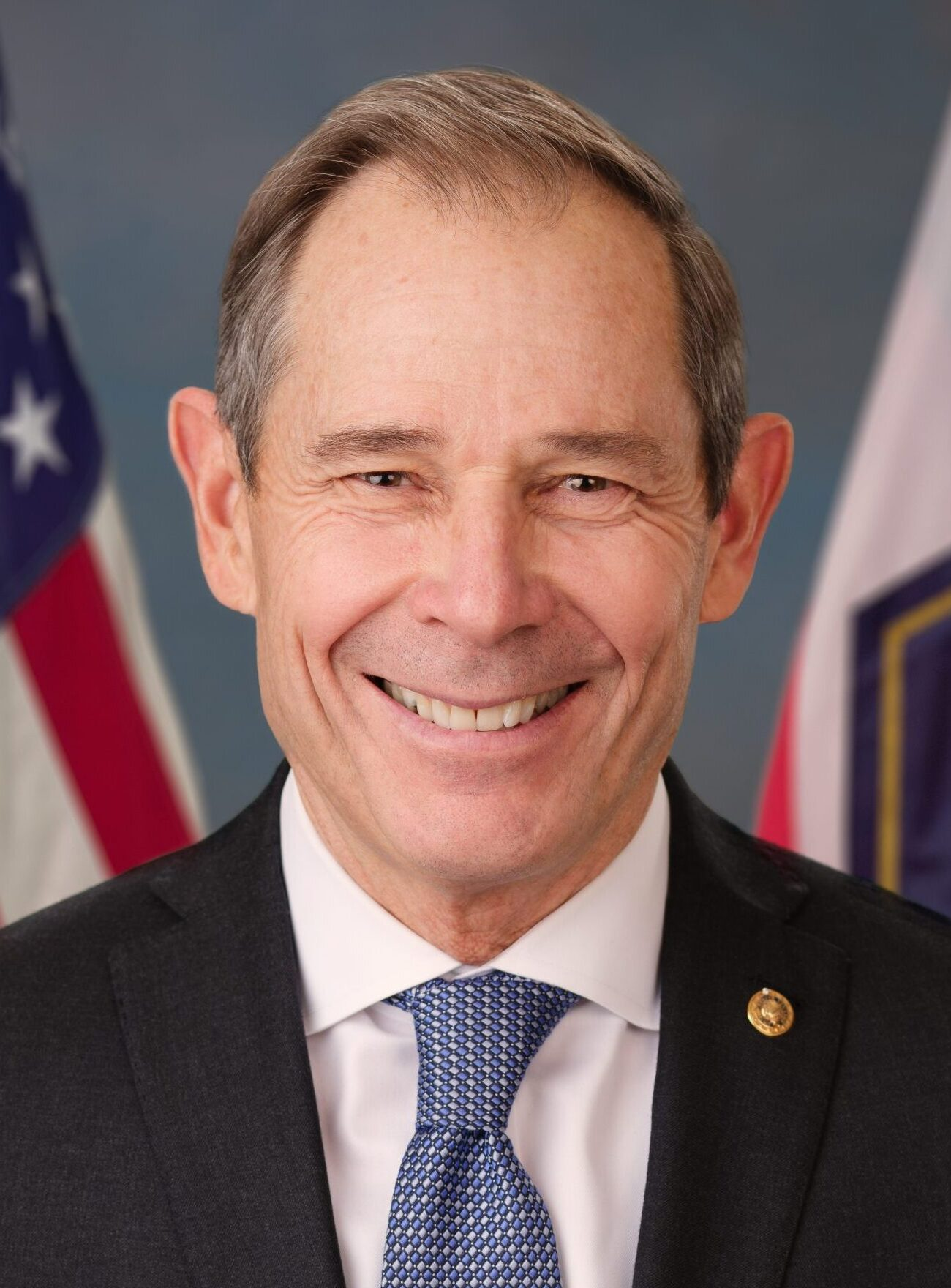

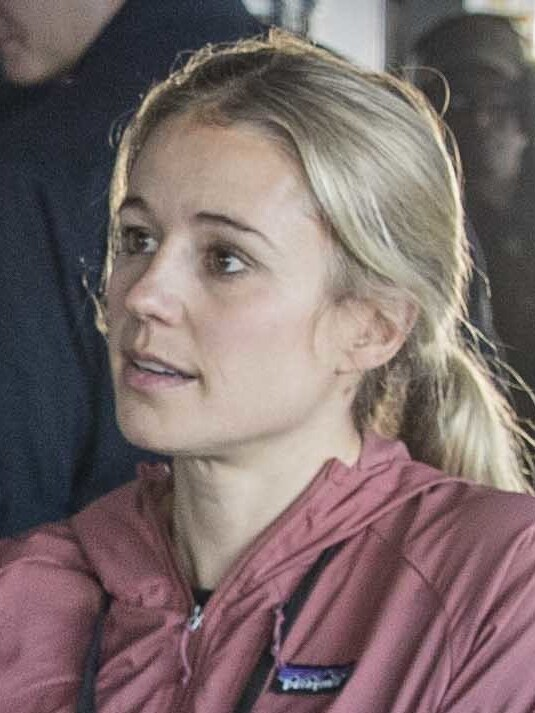

| Nominee | John Curtis | Caroline Gleich | Carlton Bowen |
| Party | Republican | Democratic | Independent American |
| Popular vote | 914,700 | 464,515 | 83,972 |
| Percentage | 62.50% | 31.74% | 5.74% |
- County results Curtis: 40–50% 50–60% 60–70% 70–80% 80–90% Gleich: 40–50% 50–60%
U.S. senator before election
Mitt Romney
Republican
Elected U.S. senator
John Curtis
Republican

One-term Republican Mitt Romney was elected in 2018 with 62.6% of the vote. On September 13, 2023, Romney announced he would not seek reelection in 2024.

The Republican nominee was U.S. representative John Curtis, who defeated Riverton Mayor Trent Staggs, and state House speaker Brad Wilson, in the primary election.

The Democratic nominee was professional skier Caroline Gleich.

== Vermont ==
Vermont election
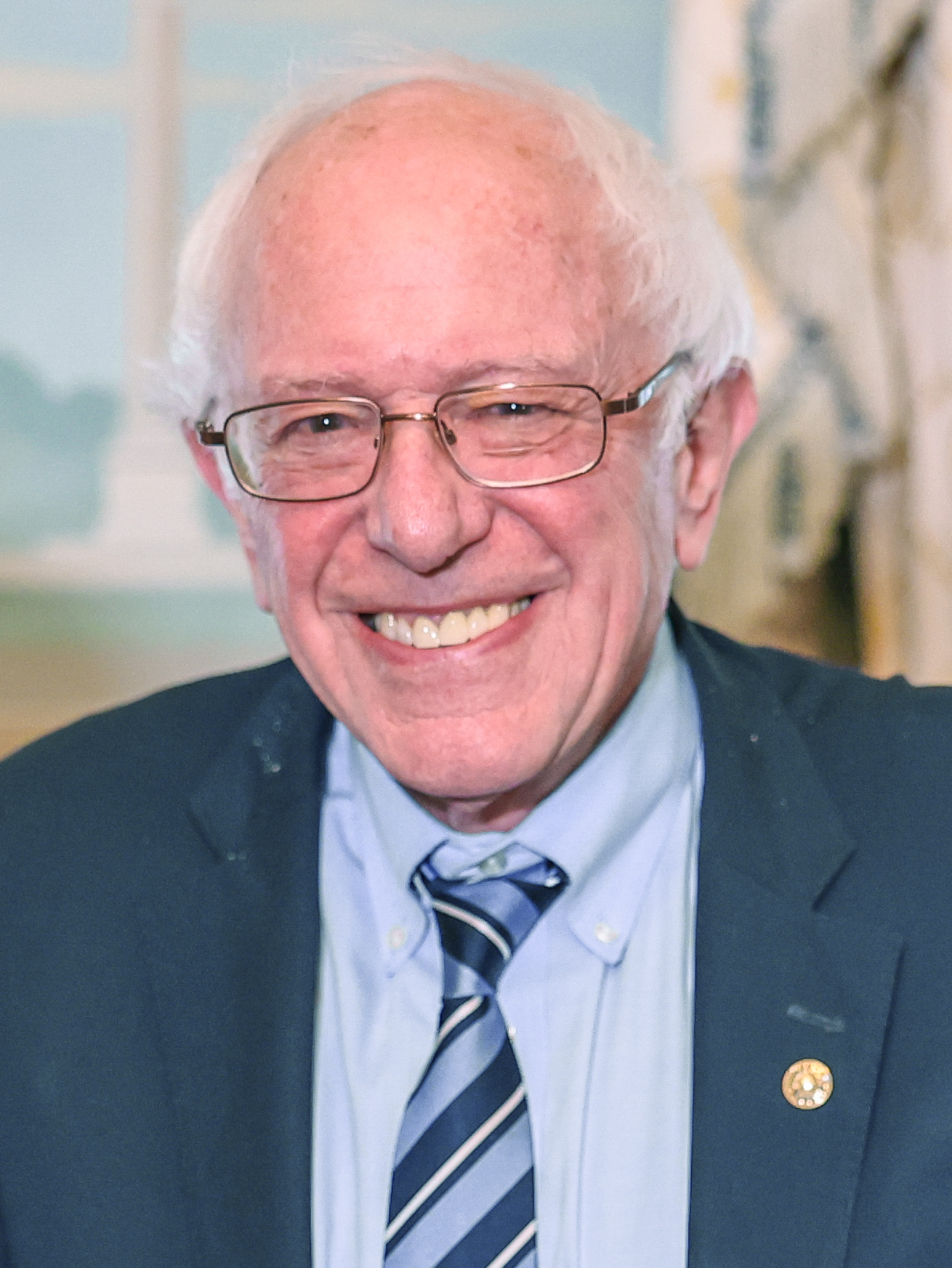

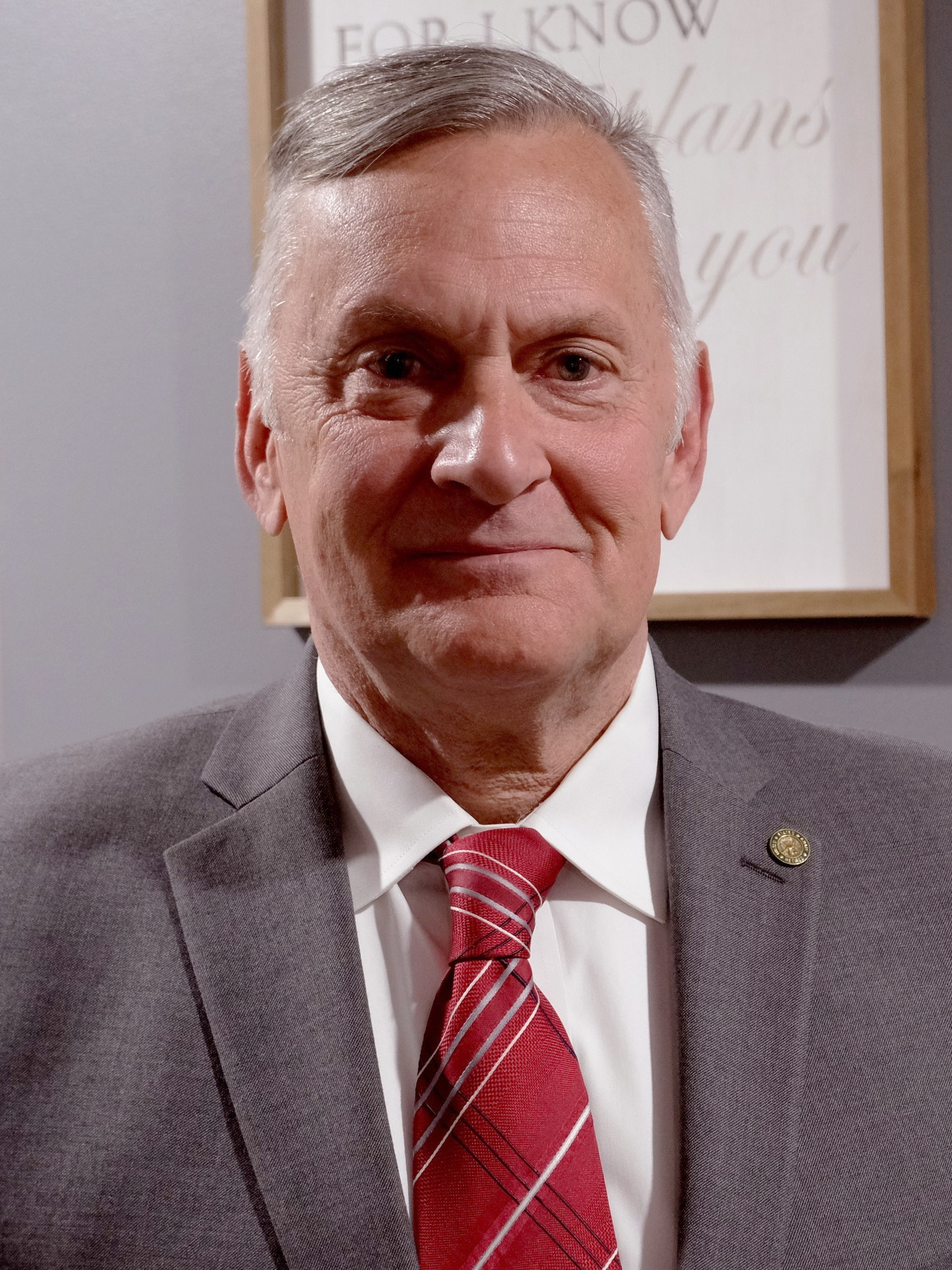
| Nominee | Bernie Sanders | Gerald Malloy |
| Party | Independent | Republican |
| Popular vote | 229,429 | 116,512 |
| Percentage | 63.16% | 32.07% |
- Sanders: 40–50% 50–60% 60–70% 70–80% 80–90% Malloy: 40–50% 50–60% 60–70% Tie: 40–50% No data/vote
U.S. senator before election
Bernie Sanders
Independent
Elected U.S. Senator
Bernie Sanders
Independent

Three-term independent Bernie Sanders was re-elected in 2018 with 67.4% of the vote. He was challenged by artist Cris Ericson, an independent perennial candidate. Businessman Gerald Malloy, who was the Republican nominee for the Senate in 2022, secured the Republican nomination unopposed.

== Virginia ==
Virginia election
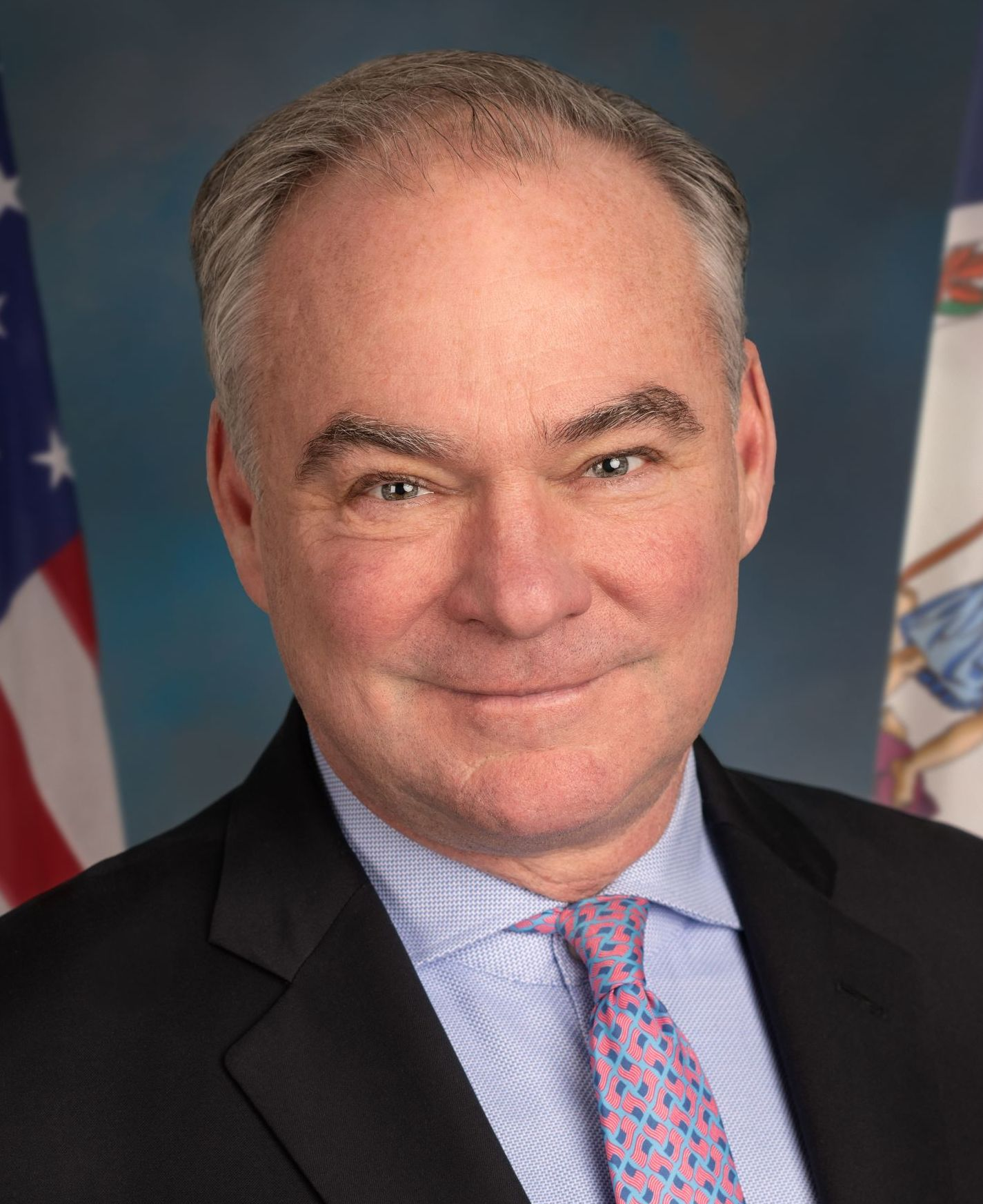

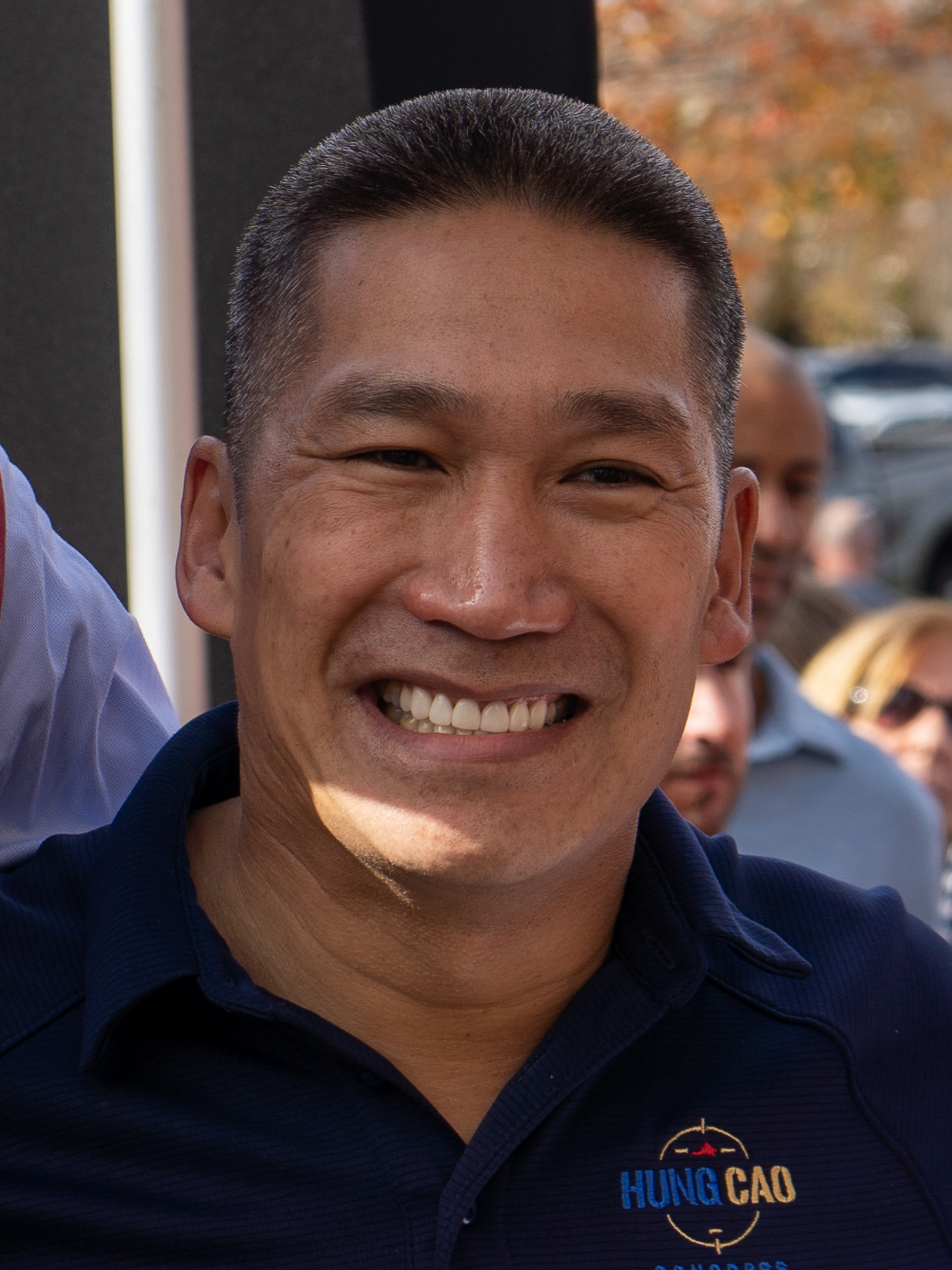
| Nominee | Tim Kaine | Hung Cao |
| Party | Democratic | Republican |
| Popular vote | 2,314,474 | 1,961,719 |
| Percentage | 54.37% | 45.44% |
- County and independent city results Kaine: 50–60% 60–70% 70–80% 80–90% Cao: 50–60% 60–70% 70–80%
U.S. senator before election
Tim Kaine
Democratic
Elected U.S. Senator
Tim Kaine
Democratic

Two-term Democrat Tim Kaine was reelected in 2018 with 57.0% of the vote. On January 20, 2023, he confirmed he was running for reelection to a third term. Governor Glenn Youngkin, who would be term-limited in 2025, was considered a possible Republican candidate.

On July 18, 2023, Navy veteran Hung Cao announced he would run as a Republican. Cao unsuccessfully ran for the U.S. House of Representatives against Democrat Jennifer Wexton in 2022.

Kaine defeated Cao 54% to 45%.

Republican primary results
| Party | Candidate | Votes | % |
|---|---|---|---|
| Republican | Hung Cao | 168,868 | 61.79% |
| Republican | Scott Parkinson | 29,940 | 10.95% |
| Republican | Eddie Garcia | 26,777 | 9.80% |
| Republican | Chuck Smith | 24,108 | 8.82% |
| Republican | Jonathan Emord | 23,614 | 8.64% |
| Total votes | | 273,307 | 100.00% |

2024 United States Senate election in Virginia
| Party | Candidate | Votes | % | ±% |
|---|---|---|---|---|
| Democratic | Tim Kaine (incumbent) | 2,417,115 | 54.37% | −2.63% |
| Republican | Hung Cao | 2,019,911 | 45.44% | +4.44% |
| Write-in | | 8,509 | 0.19% | +0.03% |
| Total votes | | 4,445,535 | 100.00% | N/A |
| Democratic hold | | | | |

== Washington ==
Washington election
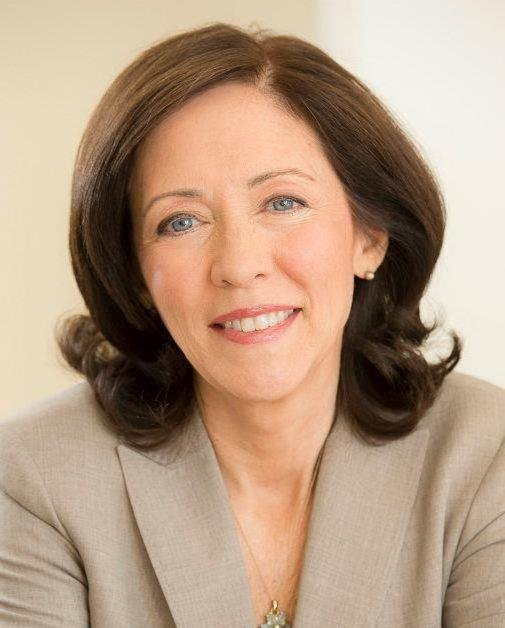

| Candidate | Maria Cantwell | Raul Garcia |
| Party | Democratic | Republican |
| Popular vote | 2,252,577 | 1,549,187 |
| Percentage | 59.09% | 40.64% |
- County results Cantwell: 50–60% 60–70% 70–80% Garcia: 50–60% 60–70% 70–80%
U.S. senator before election
Maria Cantwell
Democratic
Elected U.S. Senator
Maria Cantwell
Democratic

Four-term Democrat Maria Cantwell was reelected in 2018 with 58.4% of the vote.

Emergency room physician Raul Garcia announced that he would run as a Republican.

== West Virginia ==
West Virginia election
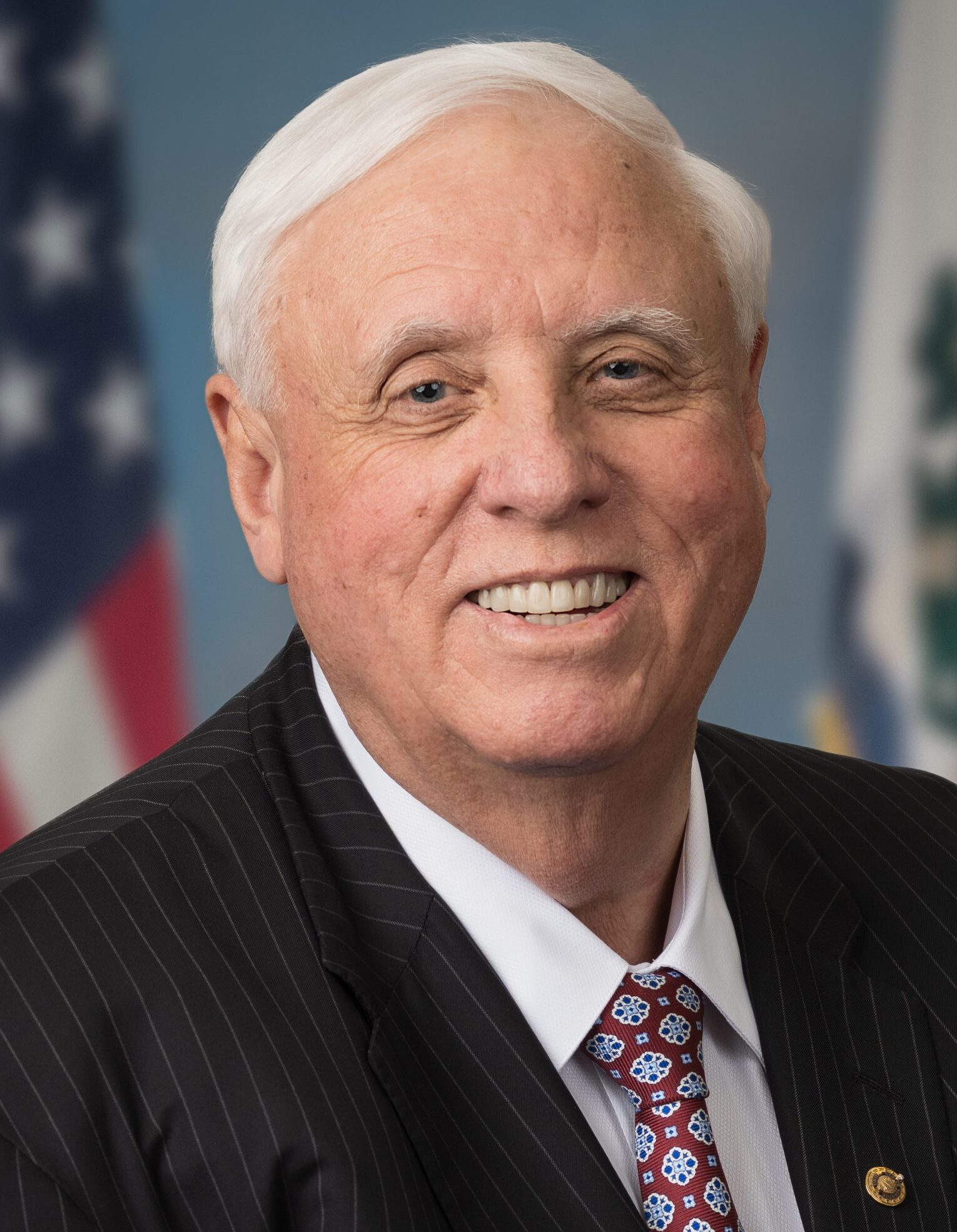

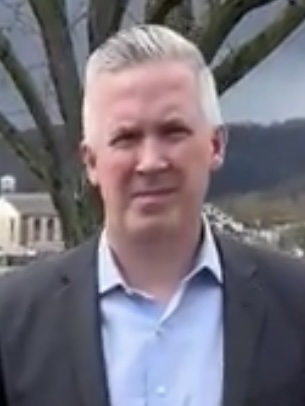
| Nominee | Jim Justice | Glenn Elliott |
| Party | Republican | Democratic |
| Popular vote | 514,079 | 207,548 |
| Percentage | 68.75% | 27.76% |
- County results Justice: 50–60% 60–70% 70–80% 80–90%
U.S. senator before election
Joe Manchin
Independent
Elected U.S. Senator
Jim Justice
Republican

Independent Joe Manchin, who was elected as a Democrat, was re-elected in 2018 with 49.6% of the vote. On November 9, 2023, Manchin announced he would not seek re-election. Since Manchin announced his retirement, all major outlets rated this seat as expected to flip to GOP control, which would put this seat in Republican hands for the first time in 68 years.

Popular governor Jim Justice easily defeated U.S. representative Alex Mooney in the Republican primary.

Wheeling mayor Glenn Elliott, who had Manchin's endorsement, defeated community organizer and U.S. Marine Corps veteran Zachary Shrewsbury and former coal executive Don Blankenship in the primary for the Democratic Party nomination.

Due to West Virginia's heavy Republican lean, the absence of Manchin, Justice's personal popularity, and being held concurrently with a presidential race in a state in which Donald Trump was expected to win in a landslide, a Republican pickup for this seat was considered a foregone conclusion in 2024.

Justice was sworn in as a Senator on January 14, 2025, giving elected Republicans control of both of West Virginia’s Senate seats for the first time since 1931 and giving the state an entirely Republican congressional delegation for the first time since 1923. (Note: Republicans held both of West Virginia's Senate seats in 1958 when Republican John Hoblitzell was appointed to continue the term of Democrat Matthew M. Neely before losing his bid to finish Neely's term in a special election the same year.) This was the first time since the 1956 special election that a Republican won West Virginia's Class I Senate Seat.

Democratic primary results
| Party | Candidate | Votes | % |
|---|---|---|---|
| Democratic | Glenn Elliott | 46,176 | 45.40% |
| Democratic | Zach Shrewsbury | 36,754 | 36.14% |
| Democratic | Don Blankenship | 18,778 | 18.46% |
| Total votes | | 101,708 | 100.00% |

Republican primary results
| Party | Candidate | Votes | % |
|---|---|---|---|
| Republican | Jim Justice | 138,307 | 61.84% |
| Republican | Alex Mooney | 59,348 | 26.54% |
| Republican | Bryan Bird | 7,001 | 3.13% |
| Republican | Bryan McKinney | 6,573 | 2.94% |
| Republican | Zane Lawhorn | 4,517 | 2.02% |
| Republican | Janet McNulty | 4,404 | 1.97% |
| Republican | Don Lindsay | 3,503 | 1.57% |
| Total votes | | 223,653 | 100.00% |

2024 United States Senate election in West Virginia
| Party | Candidate | Votes | % | ±% |
|---|---|---|---|---|
| Republican | Jim Justice | 514,079 | 68.75% | +22.49% |
| Democratic | Glenn Elliott | 207,548 | 27.76% | −21.81% |
| Libertarian | David Moran | 26,075 | 3.49% | −0.68% |
| Write-in | | 15 | 0.00% | N/A |
| Total votes | | 747,717 | 100.00% | N/A |
| Republican gain from Independent | | | | |

== Wisconsin ==
Wisconsin election
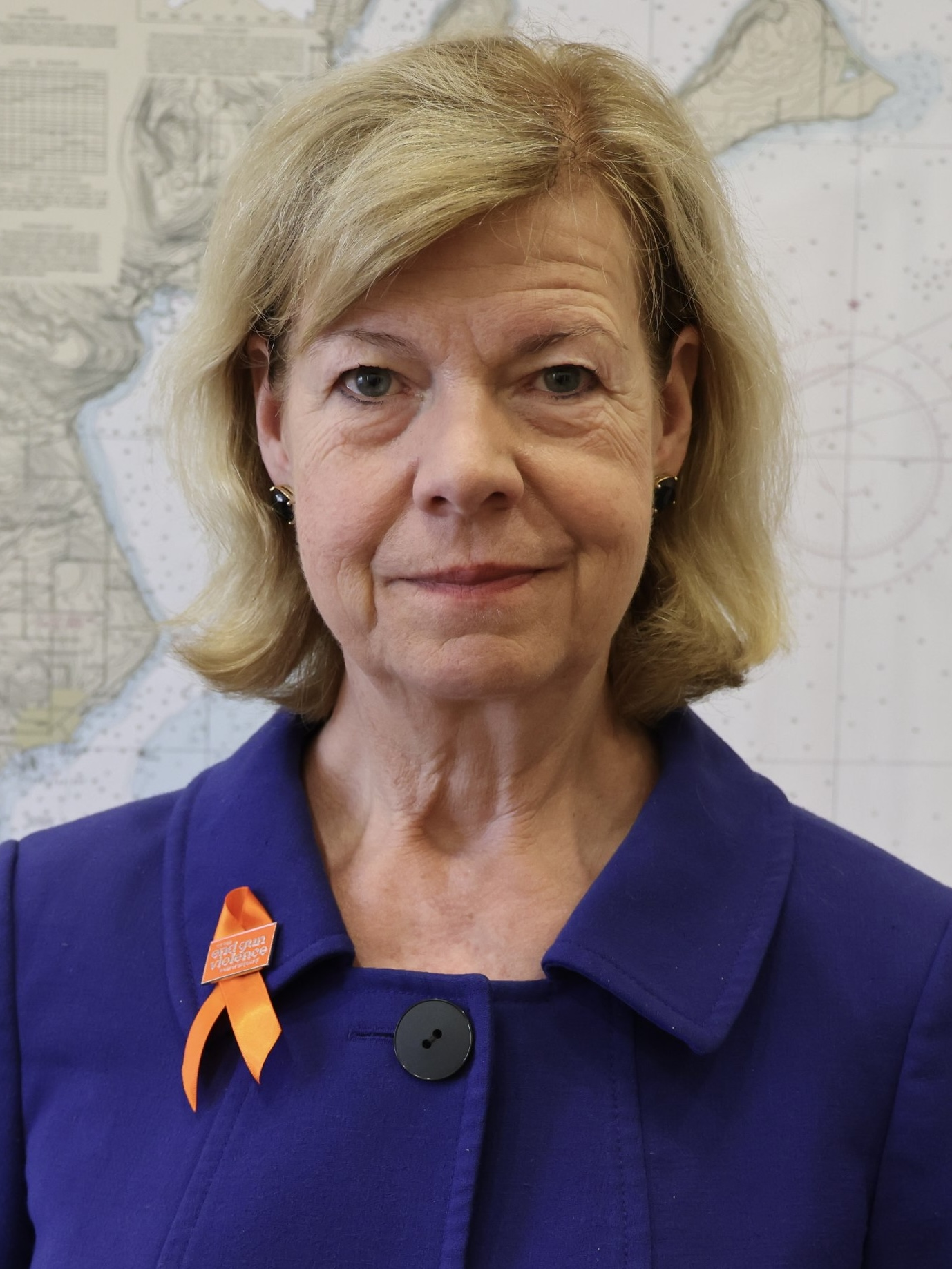

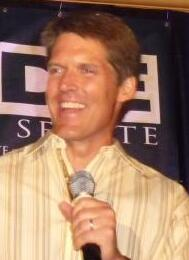
| Nominee | Tammy Baldwin | Eric Hovde |
| Party | Democratic | Republican |
| Popular vote | 1,672,777 | 1,643,996 |
| Percentage | 49.33% | 48.48% |
- County results Baldwin: 40–50% 50–60% 60–70% 70–80% Hovde: 40–50% 50–60% 60–70% 70–80%
U.S. senator before election
Tammy Baldwin
Democratic
Elected U.S. Senator
Tammy Baldwin
Democratic

Two-term Democrat Tammy Baldwin was reelected in 2018 with 55.4% of the vote. She ran for reelection. Hedge fund manager Eric Hovde, candidate for the Senate in 2012, announced a second attempt at the Republican nomination. Former Milwaukee County sheriff David Clarke was seen as a potential Republican challenger to Hovde's bid, but never ended up beginning a campaign for Senate.

== Wyoming ==
Wyoming election
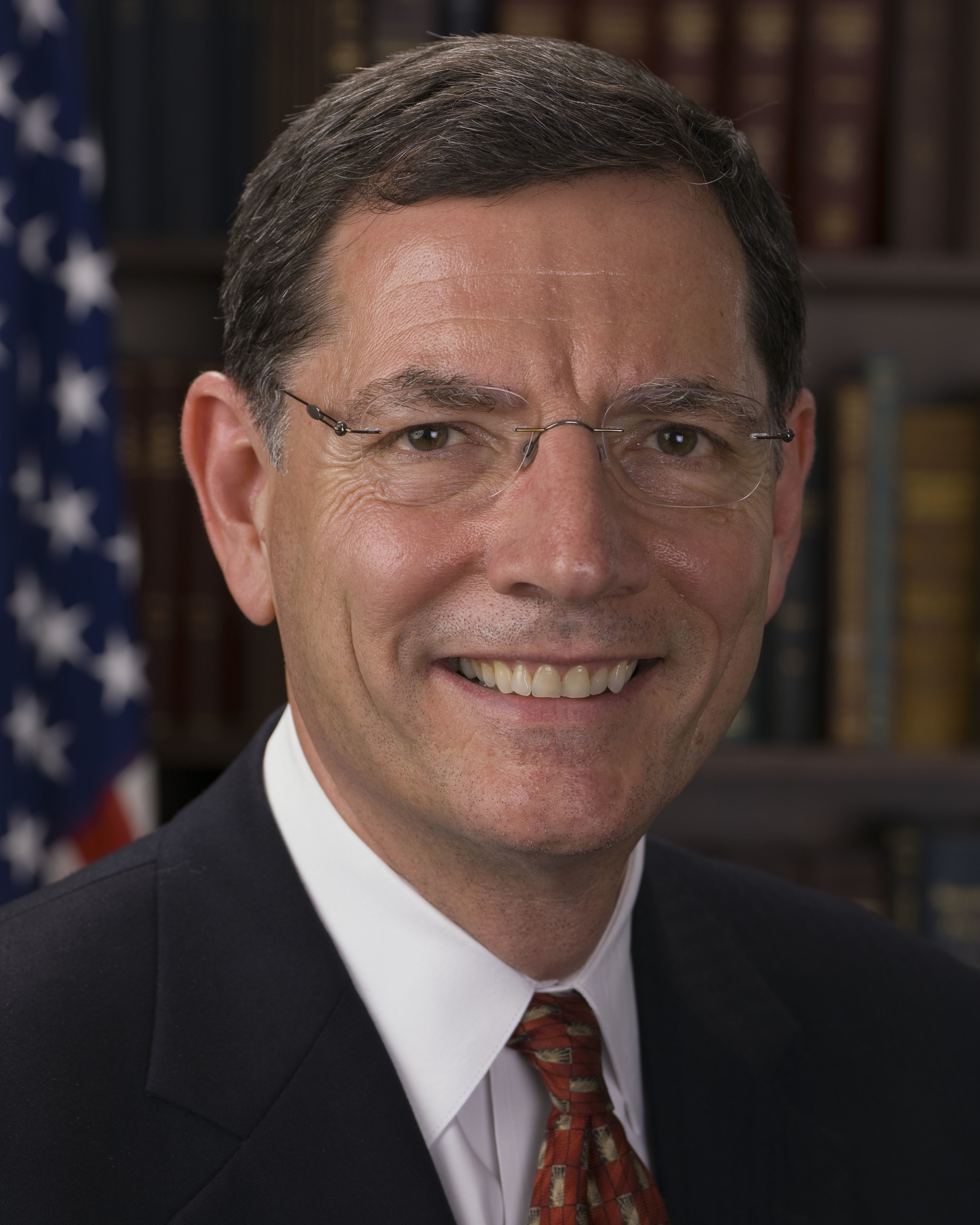

| Nominee | John Barrasso | Scott Morrow |
| Party | Republican | Democratic |
| Popular vote | 198,418 | 63,727 |
| Percentage | 75.11% | 24.12% |
- County results Barrasso: 50–60% 60–70% 70–80% 80–90% Morrow: 60–70%
U.S. senator before election
John Barrasso
Republican
Elected U.S. senator
John Barrasso
Republican

Republican John Barrasso was reelected in 2018 with 67.0% of the vote. On April 19, 2024, Barrasso announced he would run for reelection. Former Postal Union president Scott Morrow was the Democratic nominee.

Barrasso easily defeated his Republican primary challengers John Holtz and Reid Rasner on August 20, 2024.

Barrasso was easily re-elected with over 75% of the vote in the general election, defeating Democrat Scott Morrow, carrying every county except Teton, and flipping Albany. Barrasso overperformed Republican Donald Trump in the concurrent presidential election by 4.51%. This was the largest margin of victory in any U.S. Senate election since North Dakota in 2016, and it represented a significant improvement from Barrasso's 2018 performance, which was the weakest in his Senate career.

Republican primary results
| Party | Candidate | Votes | % |
|---|---|---|---|
| Republican | John Barrasso (incumbent) | 70,494 | 67.9% |
| Republican | Reid Rasner | 25,427 | 24.5% |
| Republican | John Holtz | 7,868 | 7.6% |
| Total votes | | 103,789 | 100.0% |

United States Senate election in Wyoming, 2024
| Party | Candidate | Votes | % | ±% |
|---|---|---|---|---|
| Republican | John Barrasso (incumbent) | 198,418 | 75.11% | +8.15% |
| Democratic | Scott Morrow | 63,727 | 24.12% | −5.98% |
| Write-in | | 2,017 | 0.76% | +0.60% |
| Total votes | | 264,162 | 100.00% | N/A |
| Republican hold | | | | |

== See also ==
- 2024 United States elections
  - 2024 United States gubernatorial elections
  - 2024 United States presidential election
  - 2024 United States House of Representatives elections
- 118th United States Congress
- 119th United States Congress
