= Utah Independent American Party =

Political party in Utah, US

- Chairperson: Carlton Bowen
- Founders: Will Christensen, Wayne Hill, John Poulson
- Founded: 1993; 33 years ago
- Registered voters (September 2026): 95,000 (Utah)
- Ideology: Ultraconservatism; Paleoconservatism; Anti-socialism; Mormon interests
- Political position: Far-right

Website
- iaput.org

The Utah Independent American Party (UIAP) is a third party in the U.S. state of Utah. Founded in 1993, the UIAP promotes ultraconservative, paleoconservative, and Mormon values. As of December 2025, it is Utah's third-largest political party.

The UIAP became the Utah state affiliate of the American Party in 1995, though UIAP members voted to reverse the change three years later, instead establishing their own national party, the Independent American Party, to affiliate with. During the 2024 United States Senate election in Utah, its candidate Carlton Bowen polled high enough to participate in a televised debate and received 5.74% of the vote.

== History ==
The Utah Independent American Party (UIAP) was founded in 1993 by Will Christensen, Wayne Hill, and John Poulson, who sought a "truly conservative" party in line with the teachings of Ezra Taft Benson, the 13th president of the Church of Jesus Christ of Latter-day Saints. The party has claimed that the Republican Party are too progressive, and that there are no parties more conservative than the UIAP. The party picked its name in reference to a prophecy from Joseph Smith recorded by Mosiah Hancock that both the Republican and Democratic parties would be destroyed by an "Independent American Party." The party is based on Benson's speech titled The Proper Role of Government.

In 1995, the party became the Utah state affiliate of the American Party (AP), however, following the failure of the AP to secure a national ballot line for the 1996 election the UIAP called an internal straw poll in 1998 where members where presented three options; remain affiliated with the AP, affiliate with the nascent National U.S. Taxpayers Party (today the Constitution Party), or form a "National Independent American Party" (NIAP), with the members choosing the third option with 79% in favor. The party often uses 1998 as their foundation year. In 2001, the party created additional affiliates in Minnesota and Tennessee.

The Independent American Party of Minnesota operates as a political action committee, and is not a registered party. The PAC was involved in the Draft Ron Paul movement in 2001 for the 2004 election. In 2014 the National (Utah) party announced that US Navy veteran Daryle Darnell was leading the party, and was making preparations for the 2016 United States Presidential Election. At the same time the National party announced that they would be running Cary Lee Peterson for Guam's at-large congressional district.

In 2021, Hill and Christensen passed away, and as Poulson had died some years earlier, the UIAP was left without strong coherent leadership. Greg Duerden eventually rose to become the party's chairman. In 2023, the party surpassed 80,000 registered members, and announced plans to open branches to represent Mormon colonies in Central and South America. The party has been supported by Cliven Bundy, made famous for his Bundy standoff against various federal police forces.

=== 2024 ===
During the 2024 United States Senate election in Utah, UIAP candidate Carlton Bowen polled high enough to be given a spot on the Utah Debate Commission (UDC) sponsored debate, alongside Republican candidate John Curtis and Democratic candidate Caroline Gleich. Bowen campaigned on reducing the size of National monument protected areas, for rejecting any and all environmental protections, and for his opposition to abortion even in cases of rape or incest. Bowen ultimately received 5.74% of the vote. During the 2024 Utah gubernatorial election, the party's candidate, Tommy Williams, received 1.84% of the vote.

== Criticism ==
After the 2016 presidential election, the UIAP saw a surge in registration, though it is believed that UIAP's voter registration and performance in polls is exaggerated due to independent and unaffiliated voters mistakenly registering for the party. Utah County clerk Josh Daniels said that "90% of people who are registered with the [U]IAP don't realize they're registered with an actual political party." For example, in 2022, there were 61,321 registered members of the UIAP, despite the party only having 9,194 active voters. This became a more serious problem in 2021 when the Utah state government passed a bill that cut off Utahns' ability to switch political party affiliation months before primary elections, which saw a huge surge in the party's numbers as voters thought registering as a party member meant that they were registered as independent voters.
