= John Curtis =

American politician (born 1960)

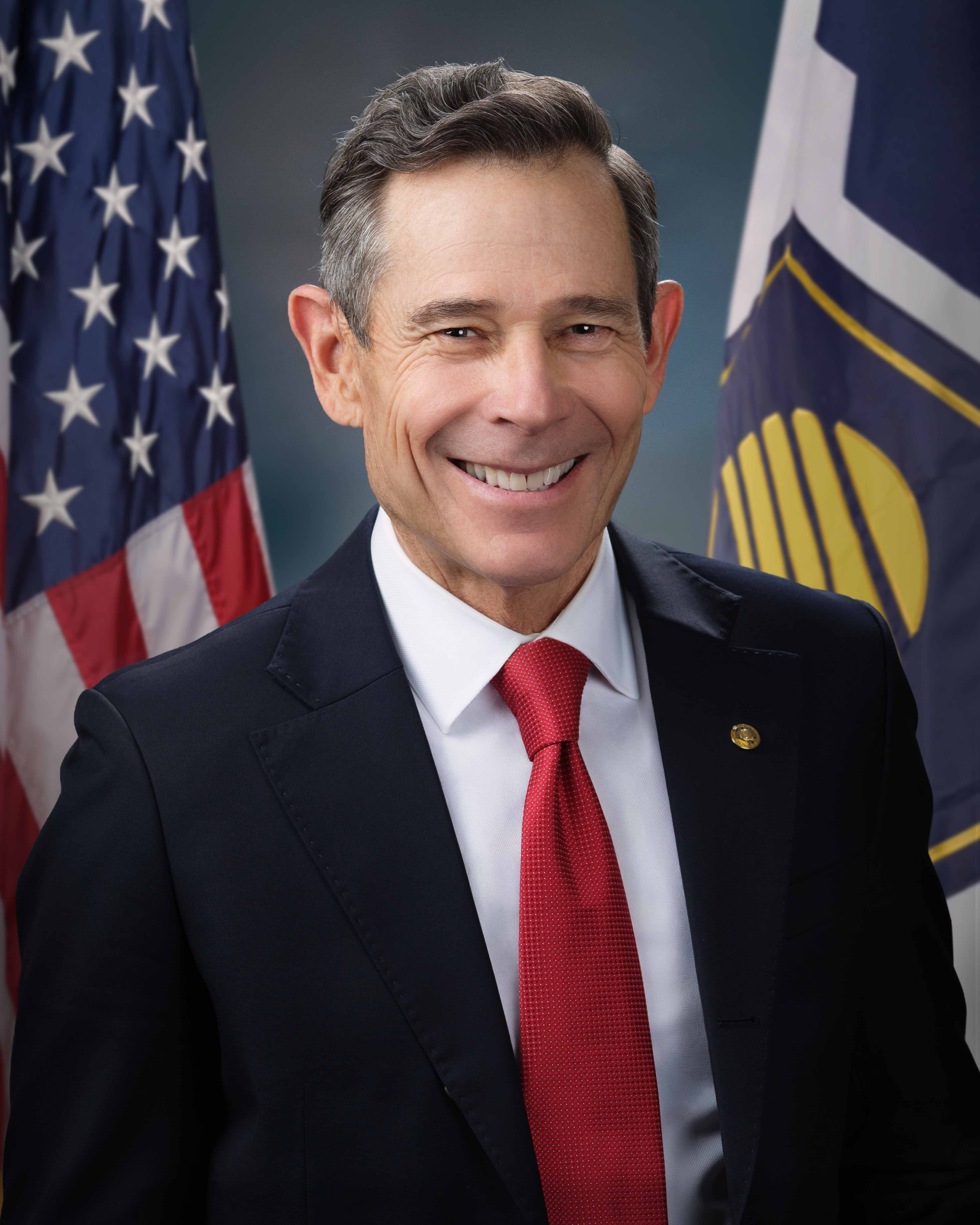
- Official portrait, 2026

United States Senator from Utah
- Incumbent
- Assumed office January 3, 2025 Serving with Mike Lee
- Preceded by: Mitt Romney

Member of the U.S. House of Representatives from Utah's 3rd district
- In office November 7, 2017 – January 3, 2025 (Note: Curtis's official service begins on the date of the special election, while he was not sworn in until November 13, 2017.)
- Preceded by: Jason Chaffetz
- Succeeded by: Mike Kennedy

44th Mayor of Provo
- In office January 5, 2010 – November 13, 2017
- Preceded by: Lewis Billings
- Succeeded by: Michelle Kaufusi

Personal details
- Born: John Ream Curtis; May 10, 1960 (age 66) Ogden, Utah, U.S.
- Party: Republican (before 2000, 2006–present)
- Other political affiliations: Democratic (2000–2006)
- Spouse: Sue Snarr (m. 1982)
- Children: 6
- Education: Brigham Young University (BS)
- Website: Senate website Campaign website
- Curtis's voice Curtis speaks on the Fairness for High Skilled Immigrants Act.

John Ream Curtis (born May 10, 1960) is an American politician serving since 2025 as the junior United States senator from Utah. A member of the Republican Party, Curtis served from 2017 to 2025 as the U.S. representative for Utah's 3rd congressional district and from 2010 to 2017 as the 44th mayor of Provo.

Curtis was first elected to Congress in a 2017 special election to succeed Jason Chaffetz in the U.S. House of Representatives. He was reelected three more times. In the 2024 election, Curtis was elected to the U.S. Senate to succeed Mitt Romney.

Curtis is generally considered a moderate Republican. He is the founder of the Conservative Climate Caucus and was a member of the centrist Republican Governance Group. Curtis did not support Donald Trump during the 2024 Republican primaries. Given his votes for bills such as the Respect for Marriage Act, analysts have generally considered Curtis's positions as similar to Romney's, although he has rejected such characterizations.

== Early life, education, and career ==
John Curtis was born on May 10, 1960, in Ogden, Utah, to Jesse Duckworth "Dee" Curtis and Hazel Dawn Curtis (née Ream).

Curtis attended high school at Skyline High School, where he met his wife, Sue Snarr. He graduated from Brigham Young University with a degree in business management. He worked for OC Tanner and the Citizen Watch Company before taking a position as COO of a Provo-based company, Action Target, in 2000.

Curtis ran for the Utah State Senate in 2000 as a Democrat against Curt Bramble, losing 66% to 33%. From 2002 to 2003, he served as vice chairman and chairman of the Utah County Democratic Party.

== Mayor of Provo ==
Curtis was elected mayor of Provo in 2009, defeating former legislator Stephen Clark with 53% of the vote on a platform of safety, prosperity, and unity. As mayor, he focused on economic development, revitalization of downtown Provo, and getting a beach at Utah Lake. He launched clean air and recreation initiatives, preserved Rock Canyon, and launched a blog widely read by residents. He also assisted with the purchase of iProvo, Provo City's existing fiber internet network, by Google Fiber.

Curtis was reelected in 2013 with 86% of the vote. In 2016, he announced he would not seek a third term. Under his leadership, Provo saw various improvements, and he maintained a high approval rating, averaging 93% in his final years in office.

During Curtis's mayoralty, there was controversy involving the Provo police chief, John King. Allegations of sexual misconduct by King emerged, leading to a 2018 lawsuit that claimed the City and Curtis did not adequately protect employees from King's behavior. Reporters learned that King had been investigated and forced to resign in 2012 from his post at the Baltimore Police Department following similar complaints of sexual assault, a fact not discovered in a background check before he was hired by Provo. Curtis said that any meetings regarding King focused on administrative concerns and that he never intended to discourage reports of misconduct. He ordered King to retake sexual harassment training and, upon learning of a rape accusation in 2017, requested King's resignation. The city paid $750,000 to settle the lawsuit in July 2018.

=== Awards ===
- Community Hero Award (Silicon Slopes, 2017)
- Civic Innovator of the Year Award (UVU, Office of New Urban Mechanics, 2017)
- Outstanding Citizen Award (BYU, Office of Civic Engagement Leadership, 2017)
- 2017 Freedom Festival Grand Marshal
- Person of the Year (Utah Clean Air, 2017)
- Person of the Year Award (Utah Valley Magazine, 2017)
- Top Elected Official on Social Media (Government Social Media, 2015)
- The Star Award (SCERA Center for the Arts, 2015)

== U.S. House of Representatives ==
=== Elections ===
==== 2017 special ====
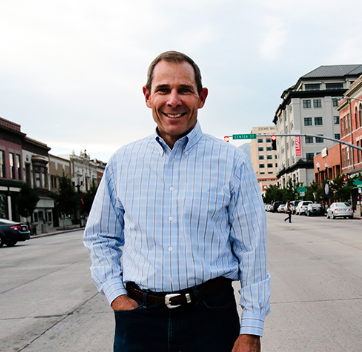
Curtis's campaign photo

On May 25, 2017, Curtis announced his candidacy for that year's special election in Utah's 3rd congressional district to replace Jason Chaffetz, who resigned on June 30. On August 15, Curtis won the Republican nomination over Christopher Herrod and Tanner Ainge. On November 7, he won the general election over Democratic nominee Kathie Allen.

=== Tenure ===
Curtis was sworn into office on November 13, 2017. Since being elected to Congress, he has held more than 100 town hall meetings, including a "walking town hall" to the top of Mount Timpanogos.

On October 16, 2019, Utah Policy reported Curtis had the second-highest approval rating among Utah's four U.S. representatives. According to the Utah Policy and Y2 Analytics poll, 45% of 3rd Congressional District registered voters approved of his performance.

FiveThirtyEight found that during Donald Trump's first presidency, Curtis voted with Trump's preferred position 94.4% of the time. Curtis has a reputation for being occasionally critical of Trump. On December 18, 2019, he voted against both articles of impeachment against Trump, calling it "a rather easy decision". Of the 195 Republicans who voted, all voted against both impeachment articles. Despite calling for Trump to be censured for the January 6 attack, Curtis voted against the second impeachment of Trump.

Curtis did not join the majority of Republican members of Congress who signed an amicus brief in support of Texas v. Pennsylvania, a lawsuit filed at the United States Supreme Court contesting the results of the 2020 presidential election. He voted to certify both Arizona's and Pennsylvania's results in the 2021 United States Electoral College vote count.

On May 19, 2021, Curtis and 34 other Republicans voted to establish a commission to investigate the events of January 6 modeled after the 9/11 Commission. Curtis did not vote to establish the Select Committee to investigate the events of January 6 that received only two Republican votes in the House.

In 2021, Curtis co-sponsored the Fairness for All Act, the Republican alternative to the Equality Act. The bill would prohibit discrimination based on sex, sexual orientation, and gender identity, and protect the free exercise of religion.

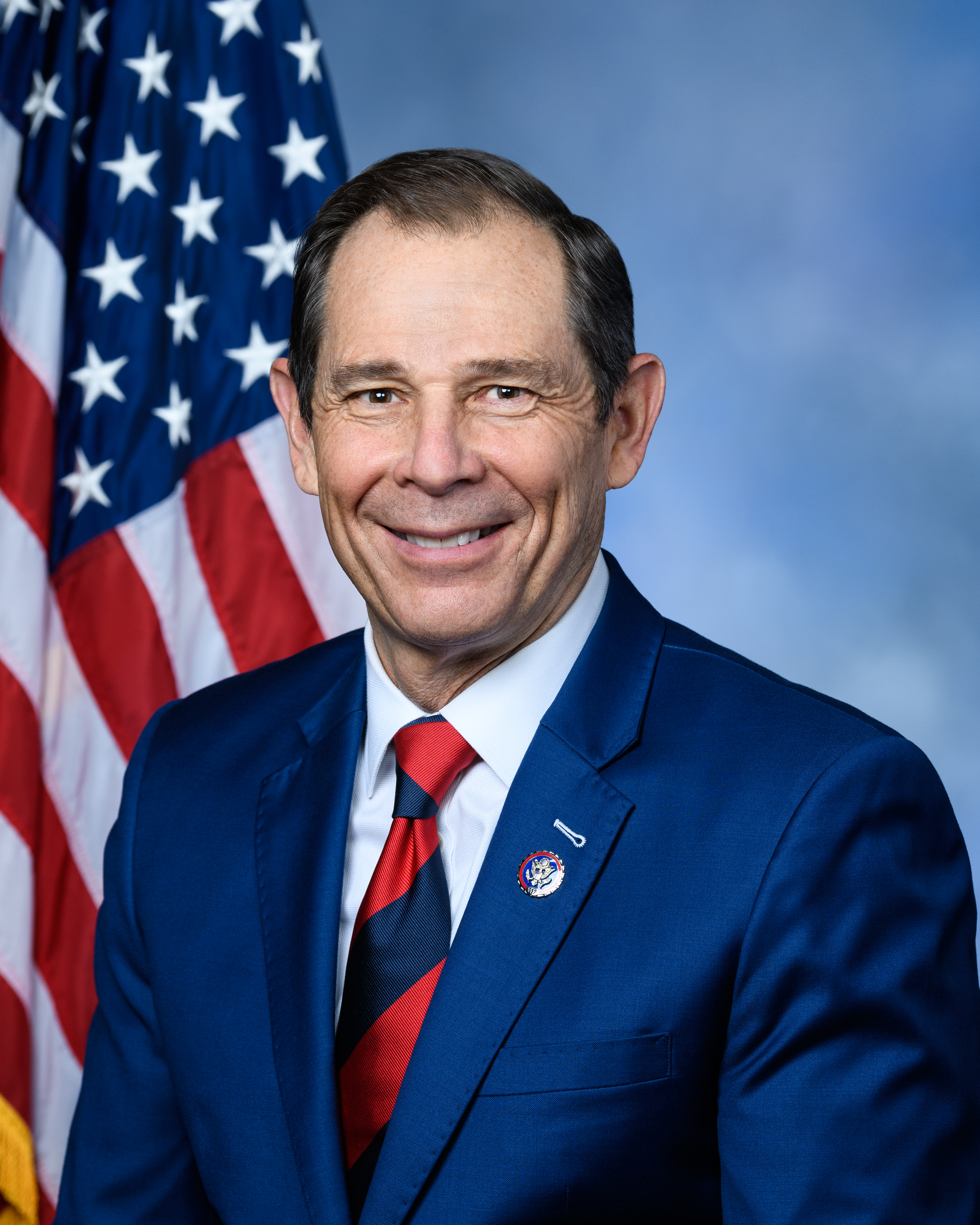
Congressman Curtis during the 117th Congress

On July 19, 2022, Curtis and 46 other Republican representatives voted for the Respect for Marriage Act, which would codify the right to same-sex marriage in federal law. Curtis was noted for not endorsing Trump in the 2024 Republican primary.

Curtis voted to provide Israel with support following the 2023 Hamas attack on Israel.

As of August 2024, the conservative group Heritage Action gave Curtis an 88% score for votes taken during his congressional career, higher than it gave the average House Republican. From 2017 to 2024, the NRA Political Victory Fund gave Curtis consistent "A" ratings, endorsing him from 2020 onward. The anti-abortion organization Susan B. Anthony Pro-Life America has given Curtis an A+ rating. The fiscally conservative organization Club for Growth has given his congressional tenure a score of 84%. The environmental group League of Conservation Voters has given his congressional tenure a score of 6%. As of 2023, the AFL–CIO trade union assessed Curtis's entire congressional tenure at 15%. The Communication Workers of America trade union has given his congressional tenure a score of 9%.

=== Conservative Climate Caucus ===
On June 28, 2021, Curtis announced the new Conservative Climate Caucus in a press conference at the Capitol. He serves as chairman and leads the caucus's 73 members, including representatives from every committee with jurisdiction over climate policy and various ranking members. The caucus's purpose is to educate Republican House members on conservative climate solutions that align with Republican principles. Curtis said: "Without Republicans engaging in this debate, we will not make the progress we need to make as a country. Any significant accomplishment in the United States has been bipartisan. The ideas that Republicans bring to the table are essential to meeting the goals that we all have for a better environment."

=== Sponsored legislation ===
Bears Ears National Monument

On December 4, 2017, Curtis and fellow Utah representatives Rob Bishop, Chris Stewart, and Mia Love introduced a bill to codify the Trump administration's reduction of Bears Ears National Monument by creating two new national monuments in the remaining areas Trump defined.

On January 9, 2018, members of the Tribes of the Bears Ears Inter-Tribal Coalition testified against the bill, including Shaun Chapoose, a member of the Ute Indian Tribe and Utah Business Committee.

SPEED Act

On June 13, 2018, Curtis introduced H.R. 6088, the Streamlining Permitting Efficiencies in Energy Development (SPEED) Act. The legislation proposes streamlining the oil and gas permitting process by allowing the Bureau of Land Management to expedite approval for drilling activities that pose little or no environmental harm. The bill would have amended the Mineral Leasing Act to establish procedures where an operator may conduct drilling and production activities on available federal and non-federal land. Community members criticized Curtis for his sponsorship, saying the act omitted the required environmental impact analysis and allowed drilling on land without notifying the public or providing an opportunity to comment.

Public-Private Partnership Advisory Council to End Human Trafficking Act

On December 12, 2018, Curtis introduced H.R. 7271, the "Public-Private Partnership Advisory Council to End Human Trafficking Act", the companion bill to Senator Orrin Hatch's legislation. The bill creates a Public-Private Advisory Council to provide a direct line to federal government agencies to streamline bureaucratic hurdles while empowering nonprofits and nongovernmental organizations in fighting human trafficking.

Government Shutdown Prevention Act

On January 16, 2019, Curtis and Lloyd Smucker introduced the Government Shutdown Prevention Act. The legislation aims to end political game-playing and fix Congress's dysfunctional budget process. If passed, it would automatically continue government funding through a continuing resolution. The bill would implement a five percent spending penalty when the continuing resolution begins. Federal spending would be reduced by two percent 60 days after the first day of the fiscal year and by an additional two percent each subsequent 60-day period. Curtis said, "The American people expect Congress to do its most basic job: pass a budget and fund the government. If we can't, then we shouldn't get paid." Curtis asked the Clerk of the House to withhold his pay until Congress fully funded the government. He believes that Republicans and Democrats should be held accountable to find common ground to solve funding impasses.

Transparency in Student Lending Act

On January 28, 2019, Curtis introduced the Transparency in Student Lending Act, legislation to improve the information provided to students and families taking on federal loans to finance higher education. The bill would require the disclosure of the annual percentage rate (APR) for federal student loans before disbursement. The APR assists borrowers by showing the true cost of a loan, helping students and their families make more informed financial decisions. Curtis said, "As the primary provider of the vast majority of student loans and education financing options, the federal government should provide a transparent and full accounting of associated costs and fees for borrowers. I represent the youngest Congressional district in the country with an average age of 26 years old; these students must be equipped to make the right decisions for their families and their futures."

Bicameral Congressional Trade Authority Act

On February 1, 2019, Curtis introduced the Bicameral Congressional Trade Authority Act of 2019. The bill would require the president to submit to Congress any proposal to adjust imports in the interest of national security under Section 232 of the Trade Expansion Act of 1962. A companion bill was introduced in the Senate. Curtis said the trade war was mostly hurting small businesses and that he had "heard for months almost daily, if not daily, weekly from businesses it's hurting and unfortunately it's having a disproportionate impact on small businesses. And 99 percent of the businesses in my district are small businesses. We need to quickly resolve this because they're the ones who are least able to sustain it. This bill ensures their priorities will be incorporated."

Natural Resources Management Act

On March 11, 2019, the Natural Resources Management Act, considered a highly significant public lands bill, was signed into law. The act consists of about 100 bills joined into one, including two proposals carried by Curtis.

On February 26, 2019, Curtis spoke on the House floor, advocating for the Natural Resources Management Act. "The Emery County bill has been a locally driven effort and will bring long-term certainty to the area through various designations and expanding Goblin Valley State Park for better management," he said. "It will also generate millions of dollars to help Utah's schoolchildren through school trust land exchanges." The House passed the largest public lands bill in decades, establishing hundreds of thousands of acres of wilderness across the nation, including a vast swath of Utah, and allowing the creation of a new national monument.

The Natural Resources Management Act is a public lands package that comprises over 100 individual bills, including ten locally driven pieces of legislation that directly impact Utah.

In May 2018, Curtis drew criticism after introducing the Emery County Public Land Management Act of 2018. Opponents argued the bill omitted approximately 900,000 acres of wilderness in its proposed designation, including Labyrinth Canyon and Muddy Creek. Conservation groups accused Curtis of removing the existing Wilderness Study Area protection to facilitate coal mining. One of these opponents, the Southern Utah Wilderness Alliance (SUWA), ultimately supported the legislation.

On June 25, 2018, it was announced that the congressional subcommittee had overstated environmental groups' support for the Emery County Public Land Management Act of 2018. An aide to Curtis stated there was a mix-up and the record would be corrected. Seven environmental organizations were named as supporting the legislation in a June 18 background memo ahead of a hearing before the Federal Lands Subcommittee, but just one of the groups named said it was accurate to call it a supporter.

Fairness for High-Skilled Immigrants Act

On July 10, 2019, Curtis spoke on the House floor to advocate for HR 1044, the Fairness for High-Skilled Immigrants Act of 2019, legislation he co-authored to eliminate the per-country caps for employment-based visas and shift to a first-come, first-served process. Curtis, whose district is home to several high-tech businesses, said he regularly hears from leaders of those companies that they "do not have enough high-skilled workers … and demand continues to outstrip supply." He added, "this legislation will create a first-come, first-serve system providing certainty to workers and families and enabling US companies to flourish and compete in a global economy as they hire the brightest people to create products, services, and jobs—regardless of where they were born." After he spoke, the legislation passed the House, 365-65.

House Foreign Affairs Committee

Curtis participated in a panel discussion at a U.S. Global Leadership Coalition forum on April 5, 2019, highlighting the importance of American diplomacy and foreign aid in bolstering U.S. national security and creating economic opportunities for Utah businesses. "As a member of the House Foreign Affairs Committee, I am committed to supporting the vital U.S. government programs that protect our nation's interests abroad", he said. "Our global ties help to open new markets for U.S. businesses and create jobs for Americans, while U.S. diplomats and development workers overseas are preventing conflicts and wiping out diseases before they reach our borders."

House Natural Resources Committee

On February 13, 2019, Curtis invited the National Parks, Forests, and Public Lands Subcommittee to join the Clean Air Challenge and find common ground to address Utah's and the country's environmental issues. Curtis then introduced the Provo Clean Air Toolkit, which contains strategies Utahns can use to improve the quality on personal levels and businesses can use on larger scales. He then asked the subcommittee to take the "Provo Clean Air Challenge Pledge" with him and the rest of Utah to pass along the clean-air initiative.

=== Committee assignments ===
- United States House Committee on Energy and Commerce
  - Subcommittee on Health
  - Subcommittee on Communications & Technology
  - Subcommittee on Environment & Climate Change

=== Caucus memberships ===
- Congressional Taiwan Caucus
- Congressional Motorcycle Caucus
- Republican Governance Group
- Republican Main Street Partnership
- Congressional Solar Caucus
- Congressional Western Caucus
- Ski and Snowboard Caucus
- Republican Study Committee
- Congressional Dietary Supplement Caucus
- Problem Solvers Caucus
- Conservative Climate Caucus (chair)
- Climate Solutions Caucus
- Congressional Blockchain Caucus

== U.S. Senate ==
=== Elections ===
==== 2024 ====
In 2024, Curtis announced his candidacy for the United States Senate, despite saying in October 2023 he would not run for the seat. The seat was being vacated by Mitt Romney, who chose not to seek reelection. Known for his moderate stance and strong emphasis on environmental issues, Curtis positioned himself as a unifying candidate who could appeal to both the conservative base and independent voters. He defeated former Utah House Speaker Brad Wilson and Riverton Mayor Trent Staggs in the Republican primary and Democratic nominee Caroline Gleich in the general election, with 62.6% of the vote.

Curtis's campaign focused on his legislative achievements and ability to connect with Utahns. He cited his ranking as one of the most effective lawmakers and his office's ranking as #1 in accessibility and accountability. The race attracted significant attention within Utah and nationally, as Curtis faced several challengers in the Republican primary. His campaign was marked by a strong grassroots effort, bolstered by his popularity in his congressional district and his reputation as a principled and approachable leader. Curtis focused on local issues important to Utah voters, such as public lands management, water resources, and economic development. He also addressed national concerns, including the need to balance the federal budget. This election was closely watched as a barometer of the Republican Party's direction, with Curtis representing a more traditional, policy-focused approach in contrast to some of the more populist candidates in the field. Curtis's campaign strategy included extensive town hall meetings, social media outreach, and targeted advertising aimed at highlighting his record and vision for Utah's future.

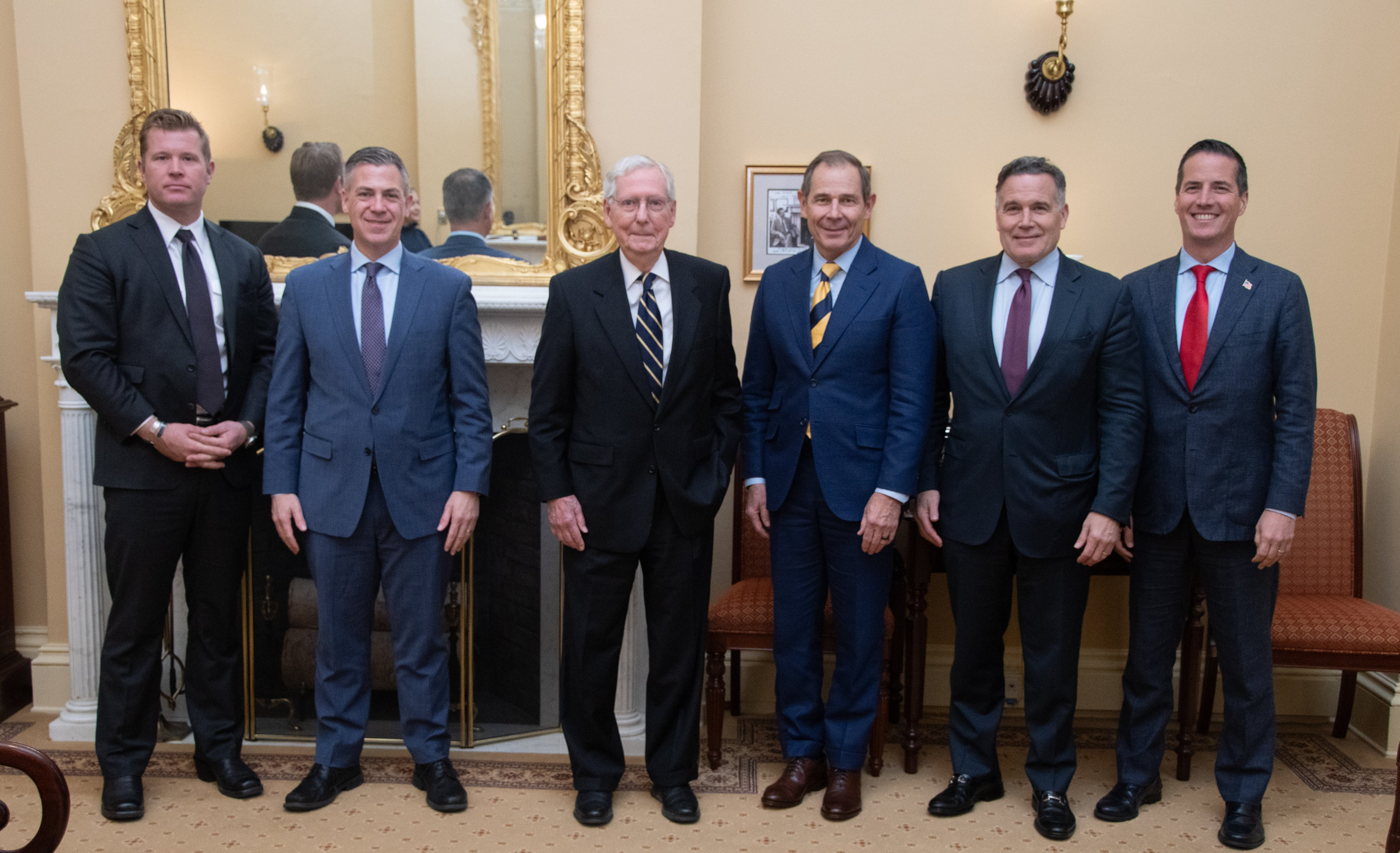
Curtis with fellow incoming Republican senators meeting Sen. Mitch McConnell, November 2024

=== Tenure ===
Curtis took office on January 3, 2025.

Even before he was sworn in, Curtis wielded influence as a crucial opposition vote to the nomination of Matt Gaetz as United States Attorney General. Alongside senators Mitch McConnell, Susan Collins, and Lisa Murkowski, his potential "no" vote sank Gaetz's chances, leading him to withdraw.

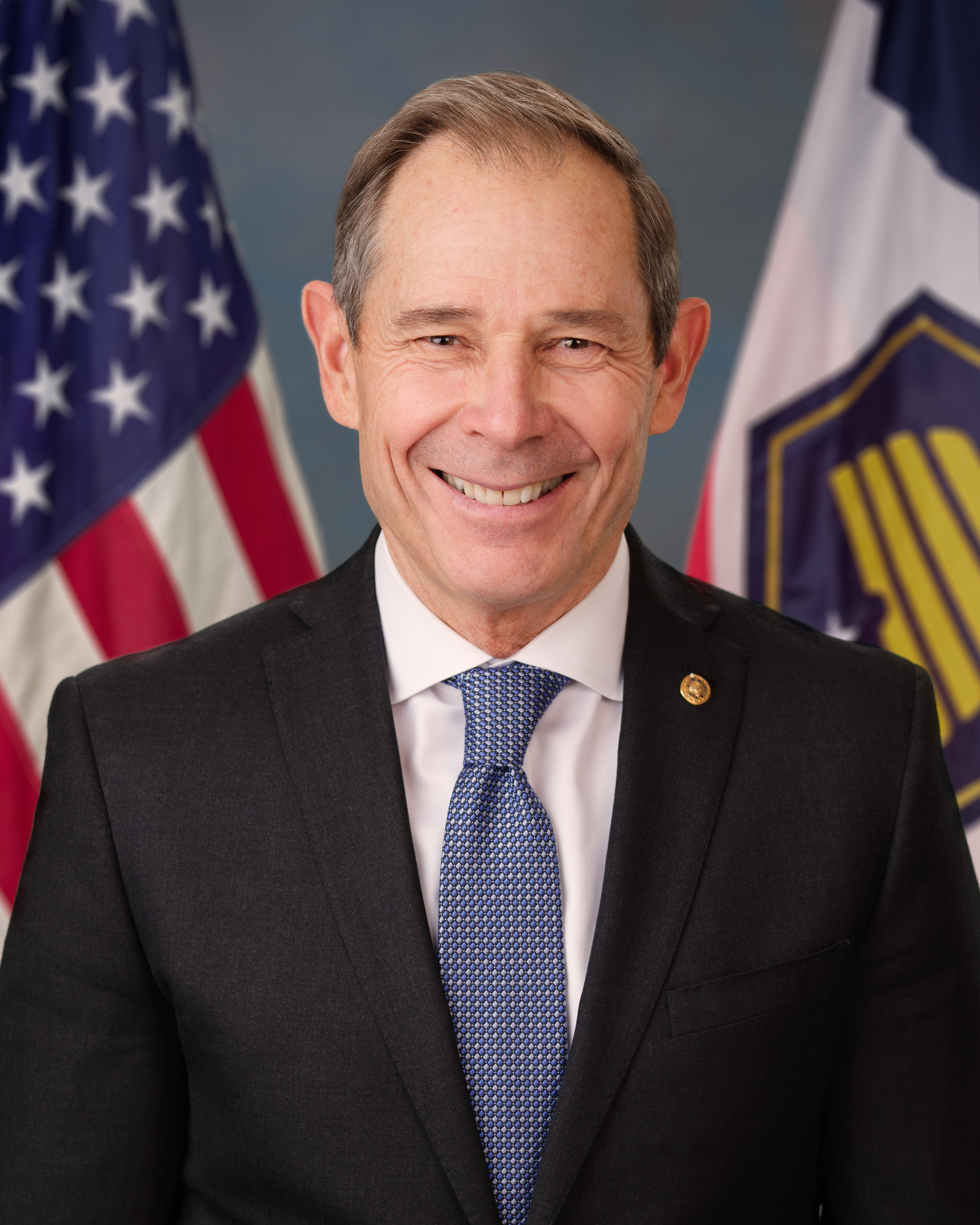
Official portrait, 2025

In January 2025, Curtis co-sponsored the Kids Off Social Media Act (KOSMA), which was introduced by Brian Schatz, Chris Murphy, Ted Cruz, and Katie Britt. Senators Ted Budd, Peter Welch, John Fetterman, Angus King, and Mark Warner also co-sponsored the Act, which would set a minimum age of 13 to use social media platforms and prevent social media companies from feeding "algorithmically targeted" content to users under 17.

In April 2025, Curtis introduced the Fix Our Forests Act alongside Senators John Hickenlooper, Alex Padilla, and Tim Sheehy. The bill aims to improve forest management for wildfire risk reduction.

=== Committee assignments ===
For the 119th Congress:

- Committee on Commerce, Science, and Transportation
  - Subcommittee on Telecommunications and Media
  - Subcommittee on Consumer Protection, Technology, and Data Privacy
  - Subcommittee on Coast Guard, Maritime, and Fisheries
- Committee on Environment and Public Works
  - Subcommittee on Transportation and Infrastructure
  - Subcommittee on Clean Air, Climate, and Nuclear Innovation and Safety
  - Subcommittee on Chemical Safety, Waste Management, Environmental Justice and Regulatory Oversight (Chair)
- Committee on Foreign Relations
  - Subcommittee on East Asia, The Pacific, and International Cybersecurity Policy
  - Subcommittee on Europe and Regional Security Cooperation
  - Subcommittee on Western Hemisphere, Transnational Crime, Civilian Security, Democracy, Human Rights, and Global Women's Issues (Chair)
- Committee on Small Business and Entrepreneurship

== Personal life ==
Curtis is a member of the Church of Jesus Christ of Latter-day Saints and served a two-year mission in Taiwan. He and his wife Sue have six children and seventeen grandchildren.

As a public figure, Curtis has gained recognition for his expansive collection of socks. He is fluent in Mandarin Chinese.

== Electoral history ==
2017 Utah's 3rd congressional district special election Republican primary
Party	Candidate	Votes	%
Republican	John Curtis	31,481	43.28%
Republican	Chris Herrod	23,686	32.57%
Republican	Tanner Ainge	17,565	24.15%
Total votes		72,732	100.00%

2017 Utah's 3rd congressional district special election
Party	Candidate	Votes	%
Republican	John Curtis	85,739	58.03%
Democratic	Kathie Allen	37,778	25.57%
United Utah	Jim Bennett	13,745	9.30%
Independent	Sean Whalen	4,550	3.08%
Libertarian	Joe Buchman	3,643	2.47%
Independent American	Jason Christensen	2,286	1.55%
Write-in	Brendan Phillips	—	—
Write-in	Russell Paul Roesler	—	—
Total votes		147,741	100.00%
Republican hold			

2018 Utah's 3rd congressional district Republican primary
Party	Candidate	Votes	%
Republican	John Curtis (incumbent)	66,404	73.32
Republican	Chris Herrod	24,158	26.68
Total votes		90,562	100.0

2018 Utah's 3rd congressional district election
Party	Candidate	Votes	%
Republican	John Curtis (incumbent)	174,856	67.5
Democratic	James Singer	70,686	27.3
Independent American	Gregory Duerden	6,686	2.6
United Utah	Timothy Zeidner	6,630	2.6
Total votes		258,858	100.0
Republican hold			

2020 Utah's 3rd congressional district election
Party	Candidate	Votes	%
Republican	John Curtis (incumbent)	246,674	68.77
Democratic	Devin Thorpe	96,067	26.78
Constitution	Daniel Cummings	8,889	2.48
United Utah	Thomas McNeill	7,040	1.97
Total votes		358,670	100.00
Republican hold			

2022 Utah's 3rd congressional district election
Party	Candidate	Votes	%
Republican	John Curtis (incumbent)	182,497	64.40
Democratic	Glenn Wright	83,687	29.53
Libertarian	Michael Stoddard	8,287	2.9
Constitution	Daniel Cummings	4,874	1.7
Independent American	Aaron Heineman	4,035	1.4
Total votes		283,380	100.00
Republican hold			

2024 United States Senate election in Utah, Republican primary
Party	Candidate	Votes	%
Republican	John Curtis	206,094	48.72%
Republican	Trent Staggs	138,143	32.66%
Republican	Brad Wilson	53,134	12.56%
Republican	Jason Walton	25,604	6.05%
Total votes		422,975	100.00%

2024 United States Senate election in Utah
Party	Candidate	Votes	%	±%
Republican	John Curtis	755,189	62.3%	
Democratic	Caroline Gleich	391,443	32.3%	
Independent American	Carlton Bowen	64,890	5.4%	
Total votes		1,211,522	100.0%	
Republican hold				

== See also ==
- List of new members of the 119th United States Congress

Political offices
Preceded by Lewis Billings	Mayor of Provo; 2010–2017	Succeeded by Michelle Kaufusi
U.S. House of Representatives
Preceded by Jason Chaffetz	Member of the U.S. House of Representatives from Utah's 3rd congressional district 2017–2025	Succeeded by Mike Kennedy
Party political offices
Preceded by Mitt Romney	Republican nominee for U.S. Senator from Utah (Class 1); 2024	Most recent
U.S. Senate
Preceded by Mitt Romney	United States Senator (Class 1) from Utah; 2025–present Served alongside: Mike Lee	Incumbent
U.S. order of precedence (ceremonial)
Preceded by Tim Sheehy	Order of precedence of the United States as United States Senator	Succeeded by Ruben Gallego
Preceded by Lisa Blunt Rochester	United States senators by seniority 90th	Succeeded by Elissa Slotkin
