= 2024 United States Senate election in Utah =

- November 5, 2024
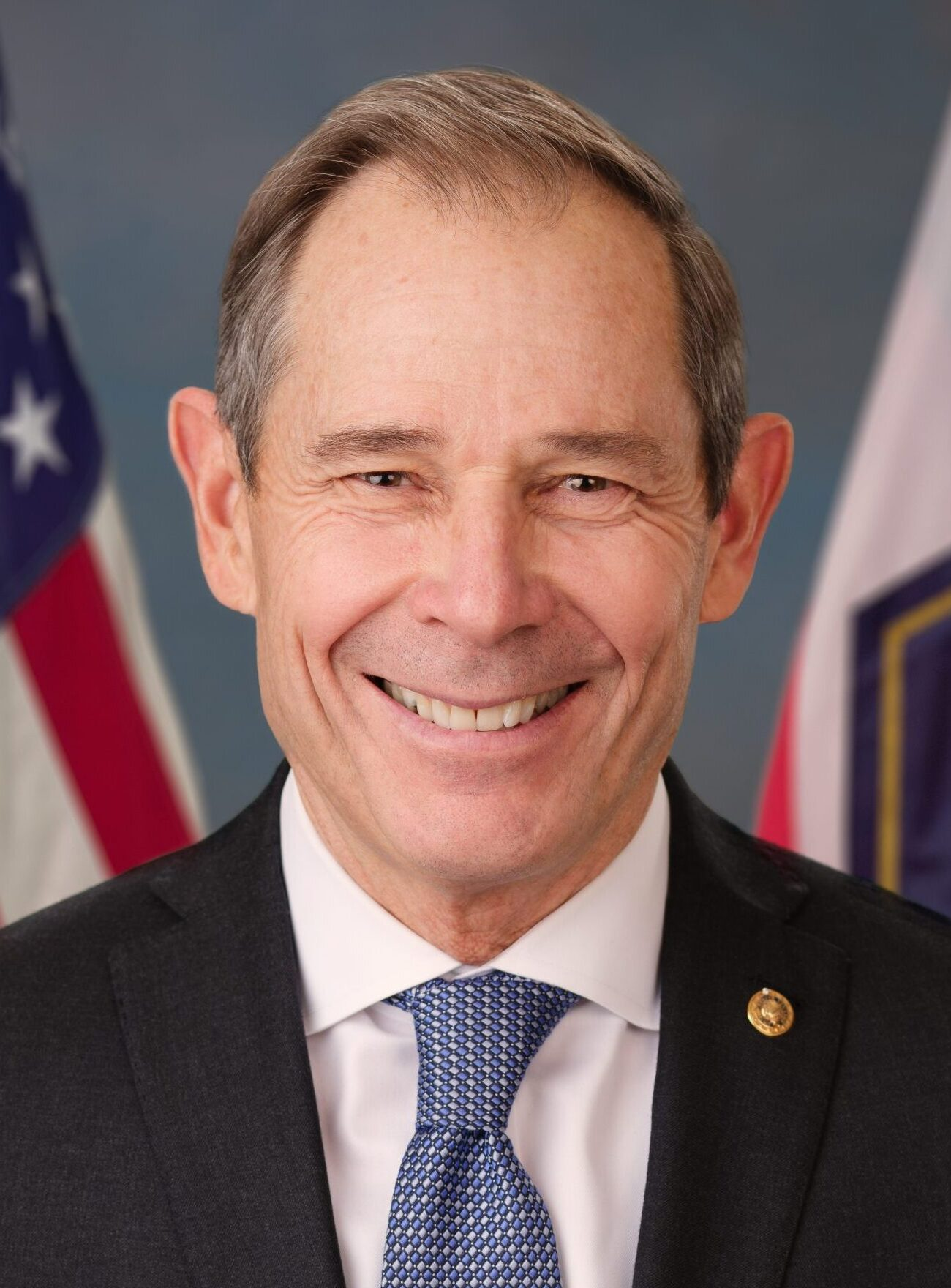

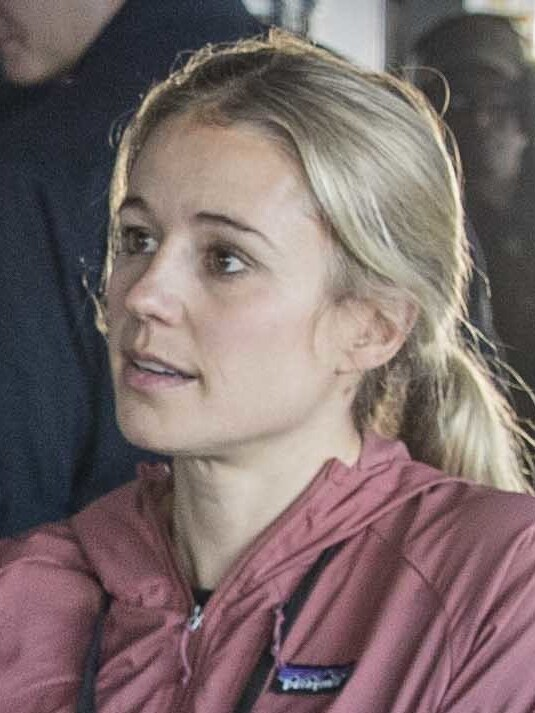

| Nominee | John Curtis | Caroline Gleich | Carlton Bowen |
| Party | Republican | Democratic | Independent American |
| Popular vote | 914,700 | 464,515 | 83,972 |
| Percentage | 62.50% | 31.74% | 5.74% |
- Curtis: 40–50% 50–60% 60–70% 70–80% 80–90% Gleich: 40–50% 50–60%
U.S. senator before election
Mitt Romney
Republican
Elected U.S. senator
John Curtis
Republican

The 2024 United States Senate election in Utah was held on November 5, 2024, to elect a member of the United States Senate to represent the state of Utah. Republican congressman John Curtis won his first term in office, succeeding Republican incumbent Mitt Romney, who did not seek a second term. Utah has been represented in the U.S. Senate exclusively by Republicans since 1977.

Despite finishing a distant second behind Riverton mayor Trent Staggs at the Utah Republican convention, Curtis won the Republican primary with 49% of the vote over Staggs and former state House speaker Brad Wilson. Democratic environmentalist Caroline Gleich won her party's nomination after receiving 93% of vote at the Utah Democratic convention.

== Republican primary ==
=== Candidates ===
==== Nominee ====
- John Curtis, U.S. representative from Utah's 3rd congressional district (2017–2025)

==== Eliminated in primary ====
- Trent Staggs, mayor of Riverton (2018–2026) and nominee for mayor of Salt Lake County in 2020
- Jason Walton, pest control company owner
- Brad Wilson, former Speaker of the Utah House of Representatives (2019–2023) from HD-15 (2011–2023)

==== Eliminated at convention ====
- Jeremy Friedbaum, piano technician and perennial candidate
- Brent Hatch, attorney, treasurer of the Federalist Society, and son of former U.S. Senator Orrin Hatch
- Brian Jenkins, window cleaning contractor and perennial candidate
- Carolyn Phippen, former advisor to U.S. Senator Mike Lee
- Josh Randall, accountant and audit manager
- Chandler Tanner, attorney
- Clark White, supply chain manager

==== Withdrawn ====
- Rod Bird, mayor of Roosevelt (ran for U.S. House)
- Tyrone Jensen, political commentator and perennial candidate (ran for U.S. House)

==== Declined ====
- Spencer Cox, Governor of Utah (2021–present) (ran for re-election, endorsed Wilson)
- Greg Hughes, former Speaker of the Utah House of Representatives (2015–2018) from HD-51 (2003–2018), candidate for Governor of Utah in 2020, and candidate for Utah's 2nd congressional district in 2023
- Carson Jorgensen, former chair of the Utah Republican Party (2021–2023) and candidate for Utah's 2nd congressional district in 2020 (ran for governor)
- Robert O'Brien, former U.S. National Security Advisor (2019–2021)
- Sean Reyes, Utah Attorney General (2013–2025)
- Josh Romney, real estate executive and son of incumbent Mitt Romney
- Mitt Romney, incumbent U.S. senator (2019–2025)
- Chris Stewart, U.S. representative from Utah's 2nd congressional district (2013–2023) (resigned from Congress, endorsed Curtis)

=== Endorsements ===
John Curtis

U.S. representatives

- Blake Moore, UT-01 (2021–present)
- Chris Stewart, UT-02 (2013–2023)

Organizations

- American Conservation Coalition
- American Israel Public Affairs Committee (AIPAC) (previously endorsed Romney)
- BIPAC
- ClearPath Action Fund
- Citizens for Responsible Energy Solutions
- Republican Main Street Partnership PAC

Political parties

- Forward Party
Trent Staggs

Executive branch officials

- Richard Grenell, former U.S. Ambassador to Germany (2018–2020)
- Mark Levin, Chief of Staff to the U.S. Attorney General (1988–1989)
- Kash Patel, former chief of staff to the acting United States Secretary of Defense
- Donald Trump, 45th President of the United States (2017–2021)

U.S. Senators

- Rand Paul, U.S. Senator from Kentucky (2011–present)
- Tommy Tuberville, U.S. Senator from Alabama (2021–present)

Party leaders

- Harmeet Dhillon, Republican National Committeewoman for California (2016–present)

Individuals

- Charlie Kirk, founder and executive director of Turning Point USA
- Kari Lake, former KSAZ-TV news anchor and nominee for governor of Arizona in 2022
- Vivek Ramaswamy, businessman and former 2024 presidential candidate
- John Stockton, former Utah Jazz basketball player

Political parties

- Utah Republican Party

Organizations

- Citizens United PVF
- Senate Conservatives Fund
- Turning Point Action
- Republicans for National Renewal

Labor unions

- Utah Fraternal Order of Police
Brad Wilson

Statewide officials

- Spencer Cox, Governor of Utah (2021–present)

State legislators

- 16 state senators, including senate president Stuart Adams
- 47 state representatives
Mitt Romney (declined to run)

U.S. Senators

- Steve Daines, U.S. Senator from Montana (2015–present)
- Mitch McConnell, U.S. Senator from Kentucky (1985–present), Senate Minority Leader (2007–2015, 2021–2025), and former Senate Majority Leader (2015–2021)

Organizations

- ~~American Israel Public Affairs Committee (AIPAC)~~ (switched endorsement to Curtis)
Declined to endorse

U.S. Senators

- Mitt Romney, incumbent U.S. Senator from Utah (2019–present)
- Mike Lee, U.S. Senator from Utah (2011–present)

=== Fundraising ===
Campaign finance reports as of June 5, 2024
| Candidate | Raised | Spent | Cash on hand |
|---|---|---|---|
| John Curtis (R) | $3,796,591 | $3,607,565 | $575,864 |
| Trent Staggs (R) | $1,247,183 (Note: $90,000 of this total was self-funded by Staggs) | $871,934 | $375,248 |
| Jason Walton (R) | $2,882,658 (Note: $2,500,000 of this total was self-funded by Walton) | $2,620,544 | $262,114 |
| Brad Wilson (R) | $5,019,090 (Note: $3,000,000 of this total was self-funded by Wilson) | $4,465,090 | $554,000 |
Source: Federal Election Commission

=== Polling ===
| Poll source | Date(s) administered | Sample size (Note: Key: A – all adults RV – registered voters LV – likely voters V – unclear) | Margin of error | John Curtis | Trent Staggs | Jason Walton | Brad Wilson | Other | Undecided |
|---|---|---|---|---|---|---|---|---|---|
| Noble Predictive Insights | June 20–21, 2024 | 432 (LV) | ± 4.7% | 48% | 28% | 6% | 9% | 7% (Note: "Did not vote" with 7%) | 2% |
| HarrisX (Note: Poll sponsored by Deseret News and the Hinckley Institute of Politics) | June 4–7, 2024 | 469 (RV) | ± 4.5% | 34% | 16% | 4% | 12% | – | 33% |
| HarrisX | June 4–7, 2024 | 469 (RV) | ± 4.5% | 47% | 21% | 8% | 24% | – | – |
| Guidant Polling and Strategy (R) (Note: Poll sponsored by Conservative Values for Utah, which supports Curtis) | April 30 – May 3, 2024 | 600 (LV) | ± 4.0% | 41% | 15% | 2% | 9% | – | 33% |
| Noble Predictive Insights | April 8–16, 2024 | 283 (RV) | ± 5.8% | 27% | 5% | 2% | 10% | 15% (Note: Brent Hatch with 11%; Carolyn Phippen with 1%; "Someone else" with 3%) | 41% |
| Dan Jones & Associates | January 16–21, 2024 | 428 (RV) | ± 4.7% | 18% | 3% | 1% | 8% | 18% (Note: Brent Hatch with 14%; Josh Randall with 2%; Brian Jenkins and Carolyn Phippen with 1%; Jeremy Friedbaum, Chandler Tanner and Clark White with 0%) | 52% |
| Guidant Polling and Strategy (R) | November 28 – December 5, 2023 | 600 (RV) | ± 4.0% | 40% | 6% | – | 11% | – | 43% |
| Guidant Polling and Strategy (R) | November 28 – December 5, 2023 | 600 (RV) | ± 4.0% | 44% | – | – | – | 12% | 44% |

Hypothetical polling

| Poll source | Date(s) administered | Sample size | Margin of error | Deidre Henderson | Mike Kennedy | Sean Reyes | Mitt Romney | Trent Staggs | Brad Wilson | Other | Undecided |
|---|---|---|---|---|---|---|---|---|---|---|---|
| Dan Jones & Associates | August 7–14, 2023 | 803 (RV) | ± 3.5% | – | – | – | 44% | 3% | 6% | 32% (Note: "Another candidate" with 32%) | 14% |
| Noble Predictive Insights | July 7–18, 2023 | 301 (RV) | ± 5.7% | 3% | 5% | 13% | 30% | 3% | 5% | 1% (Note: Thomas Wright with 1%) | 39% |
| Noble Predictive Insights | July 7–18, 2023 | 301 (RV) | ± 5.7% | 8% | 7% | 16% | – | 4% | 7% | – | 55% |

=== Convention results ===
State Republican convention results, 2024
| Candidate | Round 1 | | Round 2 | | Round 3 | | Round 4 | |
| Candidate | Votes | % | Votes | % | Votes | % | Votes | % |
|---|---|---|---|---|---|---|---|---|
| Trent Staggs | 1342 | 42.64% | 1571 | 51.68% | 1686 | 57.68% | 1892 | 69.74% |
| John Curtis | 683 | 21.70% | 683 | 22.47% | 721 | 24.67% | 821 | 30.26% |
| Carolyn Phippen | 411 | 13.06% | 356 | 11.71% | 273 | 9.34% | Eliminated | |
| Brad Wilson | 242 | 7.69% | 162 | 5.56% | 142 | 4.86% | Eliminated | |
| Jason Walton | 224 | 7.12% | 139 | 4.57% | 101 | 3.46% | Eliminated | |
| Chandler Tanner | 82 | 2.61% | 69 | 2.27% | Eliminated | | | |
| Brent Hatch | 107 | 3.40% | 53 | 1.74% | Eliminated | | | |
| Josh Randall | 47 | 1.49% | Eliminated | | | | | |
| Brian Jenkins | 5 | 0.16% | Eliminated | | | | | |
| Jeremy Friedbaum | 4 | 0.13% | Eliminated | | | | | |
| Inactive Ballots | 0 ballots | | 0 ballots | | 5 ballots | | 21 ballots | |

=== Debate ===
2024 United States Senate election in Utah republican primary debate
| No. | Date | Host | Moderator | Link | Republican | Republican | Republican | Republican |
| Key: P Participant A Absent N Not invited I Invited W Withdrawn | | | | | | | | |
| Key: P Participant A Absent N Not invited I Invited W Withdrawn | | | | | Curtis | Staggs | Walton | Wilson |
|---|---|---|---|---|---|---|---|---|
| 1 | Jun. 10, 2024 | Utah Debate Commission | Glen Mills | | P | P | P | P |

=== Results ===
Results by county: Curtis: 40–50%; 50–60%; 60–70%; Staggs: 40–50%

Republican primary results
| Party | Candidate | Votes | % |
|---|---|---|---|
| Republican | John Curtis | 206,094 | 48.73% |
| Republican | Trent Staggs | 138,143 | 32.66% |
| Republican | Brad Wilson | 53,134 | 12.56% |
| Republican | Jason Walton | 25,604 | 6.05% |
| Total votes | | 422,975 | 100.00% |

== Democratic primary ==
=== Candidates ===
==== Nominee ====
- Caroline Gleich, skier and mountaineer

==== Eliminated at convention ====
- Laird Hamblin, biologist and Republican candidate for U.S. Senate in 2022
- Archie Williams, heavy equipment operator and perennial candidate

=== Endorsements ===
Caroline Gleich

Individuals

- Conrad Anker, professional rock climber

Political parties

- Utah Democratic Party

=== Fundraising ===
Campaign finance reports as of April 7, 2024
| Candidate | Raised | Spent | Cash on hand |
|---|---|---|---|
| Caroline Gleich (D) | $389,534 | $303,924 | $85,610 |
Source: Federal Election Commission

=== Results ===
==== Convention ====
State Democratic Convention results, 2024
| Candidate | First ballot | Pct. |
|---|---|---|
| Caroline Gleich | 795 | 92.5% |
| Laird Hamblin | 48 | 5.6% |
| Archie Williams | 16 | 1.9% |
| Total | 859 | 100.0% |

== Independent American convention ==
=== Candidates ===
==== Nominee ====
- Carlton Bowen, former American Fork city councilor and nominee for U.S. Senate in 2000

==== Eliminated at convention ====
- Robert Newcomb, engineer

=== Fundraising ===
Campaign finance reports as of April 7, 2024
| Candidate | Raised | Spent | Cash on hand |
|---|---|---|---|
| Carlton Bowen (IA) | $8,568 | $6,017 | $2,551 |
Source: Federal Election Commission

== General election ==
=== Predictions ===
| Source | Ranking | As of |
|---|---|---|
| The Cook Political Report | Solid R | November 9, 2023 |
| Inside Elections | Solid R | November 9, 2023 |
| Sabato's Crystal Ball | Safe R | November 9, 2023 |
| Decision Desk HQ/The Hill | Safe R | June 8, 2024 |
| Elections Daily | Safe R | May 4, 2023 |
| CNalysis | Solid R | November 21, 2023 |
| RealClearPolitics | Solid R | August 5, 2024 |
| Split Ticket | Safe R | October 23, 2024 |
| 538 | Solid R | October 23, 2024 |

=== Post-primary endorsements ===
John Curtis (R)

U.S. Senators

- Joe Manchin, U.S. senator from West Virginia (2010–2025) (Independent; Democratic until 2024)
- John Thune, Senate Minority Whip (2021–2025) from South Dakota (2005–present)

Organizations

- Environmental Defense Fund
Caroline Gleich (D)

Organizations

- League of Conservation Voters

=== Debates ===
2024 Utah U.S. Senate election debate
| No. | Date | Host | Moderator | Link | Republican | Democratic | Ind. American |
| Key: P Participant A Absent N Not invited I Invited W Withdrawn | | | | | | | |
| Key: P Participant A Absent N Not invited I Invited W Withdrawn | | | | | Curtis | Gleich | Bowen |
|---|---|---|---|---|---|---|---|
| 1 | Oct. 10, 2024 | Utah Debate Commission | Glen Mills | YouTube | P | P | P |

=== Fundraising ===
Campaign finance reports as of June 30, 2024
| Candidate | Raised | Spent | Cash on hand |
|---|---|---|---|
| John Curtis (R) | $4,497,486 | $4,058,071 | $826,255 |
| Caroline Gleich (D) | $756,449 | $664,929 | $91,520 |
| Carlton Bowen (IA) | $16,084 | $15,200 | $884 |
Source: Federal Election Commission

=== Polling ===
Aggregate polls

| Source of poll aggregation | Dates administered | Dates updated | John Curtis (R) | Caroline Gleich (D) | Undecided (Note: Calculated by taking the difference of 100% and all other candidates combined.) | Margin |
|---|---|---|---|---|---|---|
| TheHill/DDHQ | through October 28, 2024 | November 27, 2024 | 51.9% | 25.8% | 22.3% | Curtis +26.1 |

| Poll source | Date(s) administered | Sample size | Margin of error | John Curtis (R) | Caroline Gleich (D) | Carlton Bowen (I) | Other | Undecided |
|---|---|---|---|---|---|---|---|---|
| Noble Predictive Insights | October 25–28, 2024 | 695 (LV) | ± 3.7% | 54% | 26% | 7% | 6% (Note: "Refused" with 4%; "Write-in" with 2%) | 7% |
| HarrisX | October 15–19, 2024 | 813 (RV) | ± 3.4% | 55% | 20% | 2% | – | 21% |
| HarrisX | October 15–19, 2024 | 813 (RV) | ± 3.4% | 65% | 24% | 11% | – | – |
| Noble Predictive Insights | October 2–7, 2024 | 539 (LV) | ± 4.22% | 53% | 24% | – | – | 24% |
| Noble Predictive Insights | October 2–7, 2024 | 539 (LV) | ± 4.22% | 51% | 21% | 2% | 1% | 25% |
| Noble Predictive Insights | October 2–7, 2024 | 800 (RV) | ± 4.0% | 50% | 23% | – | – | 26% |
| Noble Predictive Insights | October 2–7, 2024 | 800 (RV) | ± 4.0% | 47% | 21% | 3% | 1% | 15% |
| Lighthouse Research (Note: Poll sponsored by the Utah Debate Commission) | August 29 – September 19, 2024 | 526 (RV) | ± 4.3% | 53% | 34% | 8% | – | 5% |
| HarrisX | August 2–9, 2024 | 800 (RV) | ± 3.5% | 56% | 22% | 8% | – | 14% |
| HarrisX | August 2–9, 2024 | 800 (RV) | ± 3.5% | 71% | 29% | – | – | – |

=== Results ===

2024 United States Senate election in Utah
| Party | Candidate | Votes | % | ±% |
|---|---|---|---|---|
| Republican | John Curtis | 914,700 | 62.50% | –0.09% |
| Democratic | Caroline Gleich | 464,515 | 31.74% | +0.83% |
| Independent American | Carlton Bowen | 83,972 | 5.74% | +4.54% |
| Write-in | | 322 | 0.02% | +0.02% |
| Total votes | | 1,463,509 | 100.00% | N/A |
| Republican hold | | | | |

==== By county ====
| County | John Curtis Republican | | Caroline Gleich Democratic | | Carlton Bowen Independent American | | Write-in Various | | Margin | | Total |
| County | # | % | # | % | # | % | # | % | # | % | Total |
|---|---|---|---|---|---|---|---|---|---|---|---|
| Beaver | 2,605 | 82.80% | 327 | 10.39% | 214 | 6.80% | 0 | 0.00% | 2,278 | 72.41% | 3,146 |
| Box Elder | 22,803 | 79.59% | 4,050 | 14.14% | 1,791 | 6.25% | 7 | 0.02% | 18,753 | 65.45% | 28,651 |
| Cache | 41,451 | 69.16% | 15,067 | 25.14% | 3,396 | 5.67% | 18 | 0.03% | 26,384 | 44.02% | 59,932 |
| Carbon | 6,751 | 72.39% | 2,140 | 22.95% | 435 | 4.66% | 0 | 0.00% | 4,611 | 49.44% | 9,326 |
| Daggett | 451 | 83.21% | 78 | 14.39% | 13 | 2.40% | 0 | 0.00% | 373 | 68.82% | 542 |
| Davis | 108,083 | 65.16% | 45,688 | 27.54% | 12,055 | 7.27% | 44 | 0.03% | 62,395 | 37.62% | 165,870 |
| Duchesne | 7,450 | 84.27% | 790 | 8.94% | 594 | 6.72% | 7 | 0.08% | 6,660 | 75.33% | 8,841 |
| Emery | 4,200 | 85.09% | 474 | 9.60% | 262 | 5.31% | 0 | 0.00% | 3,726 | 75.49% | 4,936 |
| Garfield | 2,149 | 77.95% | 463 | 16.79% | 145 | 5.26% | 0 | 0.00% | 1,686 | 61.15% | 2,757 |
| Grand | 2,472 | 47.11% | 2,617 | 49.88% | 155 | 2.95% | 3 | 0.06% | -145 | -2.76% | 5,247 |
| Iron | 20,772 | 75.67% | 4,757 | 17.33% | 1,914 | 6.97% | 6 | 0.02% | 16,015 | 58.34% | 27,449 |
| Juab | 5,222 | 82.12% | 594 | 9.34% | 542 | 8.52% | 1 | 0.02% | 4,628 | 72.78% | 6,359 |
| Kane | 3,143 | 71.66% | 1,003 | 22.87% | 240 | 5.47% | 0 | 0.00% | 2,140 | 48.79% | 4,386 |
| Millard | 5,309 | 84.07% | 518 | 8.20% | 487 | 7.71% | 1 | 0.02% | 4,791 | 75.87% | 6,315 |
| Morgan | 5,506 | 81.07% | 911 | 13.41% | 372 | 5.48% | 3 | 0.04% | 4,595 | 67.65% | 6,792 |
| Piute | 821 | 86.33% | 76 | 7.99% | 54 | 5.68% | 0 | 0.00% | 745 | 78.34% | 951 |
| Rich | 1,214 | 84.72% | 160 | 11.17% | 59 | 4.12% | 0 | 0.00% | 1,054 | 73.55% | 1,433 |
| Salt Lake | 238,607 | 48.16% | 237,322 | 47.90% | 19,410 | 3.92% | 113 | 0.02% | 1,285 | 0.26% | 495,452 |
| San Juan | 3,694 | 59.73% | 2,141 | 34.62% | 348 | 5.63% | 1 | 0.02% | 1,553 | 25.11% | 6,184 |
| Sanpete | 10,173 | 79.66% | 1,429 | 11.19% | 1,166 | 9.13% | 2 | 0.02% | 8,744 | 68.47% | 12,770 |
| Sevier | 9,103 | 84.44% | 938 | 8.70% | 739 | 6.86% | 0 | 0.00% | 8,165 | 75.74% | 10,780 |
| Summit | 11,399 | 44.84% | 13,282 | 52.24% | 741 | 2.91% | 1 | 0.00% | -1,883 | -7.41% | 25,423 |
| Tooele | 22,984 | 68.68% | 8,140 | 24.32% | 2,336 | 6.98% | 6 | 0.02% | 14,844 | 44.36% | 33,466 |
| Uintah | 13,077 | 83.97% | 1,565 | 10.05% | 931 | 5.98% | 0 | 0.00% | 11,512 | 73.92% | 15,573 |
| Utah | 214,605 | 72.36% | 60,490 | 20.40% | 21,419 | 7.22% | 70 | 0.02% | 154,115 | 51.96% | 296,584 |
| Wasatch | 12,004 | 65.51% | 5,276 | 28.79% | 1,040 | 5.68% | 3 | 0.02% | 6,728 | 36.72% | 18,323 |
| Washington | 69,743 | 73.07% | 18,607 | 19.49% | 7,085 | 7.42% | 18 | 0.02% | 51,136 | 53.57% | 95,453 |
| Wayne | 1,196 | 73.87% | 326 | 20.14% | 97 | 5.99% | 0 | 0.00% | 870 | 53.74% | 1,619 |
| Weber | 67,713 | 62.15% | 35,286 | 32.39% | 5,932 | 5.44% | 18 | 0.02% | 32,427 | 29.76% | 108,949 |
| Totals | 914,700 | 62.50% | 464,515 | 31.74% | 83,972 | 5.74% | 322 | 0.02% | 450,185 | 30.76% | 1,463,509 |

==== By congressional district ====
Curtis won all four congressional districts.

| District | Curtis | Gleich | Representative |
|---|---|---|---|
| 1st | 61% | 33% | Blake Moore |
| 2nd | 60% | 34% | Celeste Maloy |
| 3rd | 63% | 31% | John Curtis (118th Congress) |
| 3rd | 63% | 31% | Mike Kennedy (119th Congress) |
| 4th | 65% | 29% | Burgess Owens |

== Notes ==
Partisan clients
