= Jenny Wilson (politician) =

American politician (born 1965)

Mayor of Salt Lake County
- Incumbent
- Assumed office January 29, 2019
- Preceded by: Ben McAdams

Member of the Salt Lake County Council At-Large
- In office January 2015 – January 29, 2019; Seat A
- Preceded by: Randy Horiuchi
- Succeeded by: Shireen Ghorbani
- In office January 2005 – January 2011; Seat B
- Preceded by: Stephen Harmsen
- Succeeded by: Richard Snelgrove

Personal details
- Born: November 1, 1965 (age 60) Salt Lake City, Utah, U.S.
- Party: Democratic
- Spouse: Trell Rohovit
- Children: 2
- Parent(s): Ted Wilson; Kathy Wilson
- Education: University of Utah (BA); Harvard University (MPA)

Jenny Wilson (born November 1, 1965) is an American politician currently serving as the mayor of Salt Lake County, Utah. In September 2007, she was a primary candidate for mayor of Salt Lake City, Utah. In 2016, she was Utah's national committeewoman for the Democratic Party. She is the daughter of Ted Wilson, a former mayor of Salt Lake City. Wilson was the Democratic nominee in the 2018 Utah Senate race, running against Republican nominee Mitt Romney. After her election defeat, she was appointed to replace Ben McAdams as Salt Lake County Mayor, taking the oath of office in January 2019. She was elected to that position for a full four-year term in the 2020 general election.

== Early career ==
Wilson's background is as a leadership, public relations and media consultant. She has held positions in administration, fundraising and project management for the Sundance Institute and Film Festival, the Sundance Group, the 2002 Salt Lake City Olympic Games, Voices for Utah Children, and the University of Utah’s John A. Moran Eye Center.

In 1991, she served at the federal level as assistant press secretary to U.S. Rep. Les AuCoin (D-OR) and from 1992–1996 as chief of staff to U.S. Rep. Bill Orton (D-UT). She assisted the Democratic Caucus of the Utah State Legislature in 1998.

== Salt Lake County Council ==
Wilson served two non-consecutive terms on the Salt Lake County Council, once from 2005 to 2011, and again from 2014 to 2019. On the Council, Wilson supported policy initiatives for ethics reform and open space preservation, and an initiative that provides health benefits to the partners of LGBT county employees. She served as a member of the Salt Lake County Council of Governments and as a board member of the Unified Fire Authority. She also co-founded the Jordan River Commission.

Wilson's board and committee assignments included the Sundance Institute Utah Advisory Board, Utah Museum of Fine Arts, Discovery Gateway: Utah Children’s Museum, and Salt Lake Community Action.

== 2018 U.S. Senate campaign ==
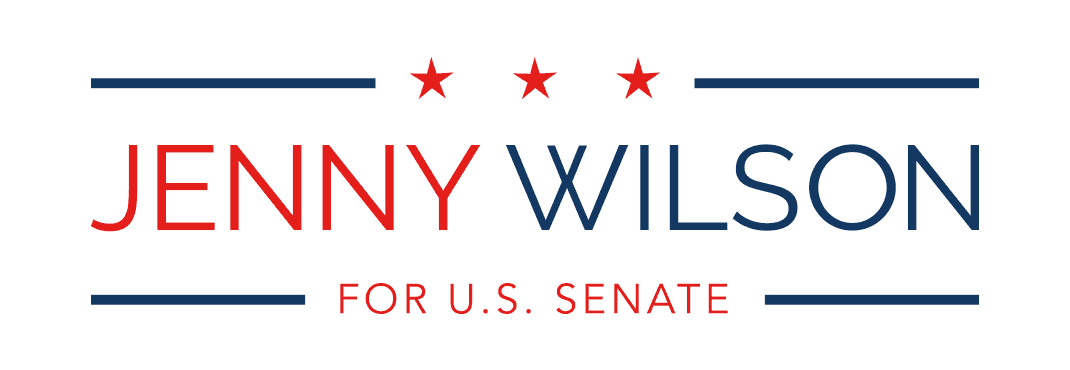
Campaign logo

In July 2017, Wilson announced her intention to run in 2018 for the U.S. Senate against Orrin Hatch. In January 2018, Hatch announced he would retire at the end of his seventh term, leaving the seat open. Wilson raised nearly $140,000 in the second-quarter fundraising period. The Republican Party eventually selected 2012 presidential nominee Mitt Romney to run against Wilson to succeed Hatch.

Wilson lost the election on November 6, 2018, to Romney by 336,674 votes. Wilson had raised and spent just under $1 million on her campaign, compared to Romney's $5 million.

== Mayor of Salt Lake County ==
=== Selection and elections ===
On January 25, 2019, Salt Lake County Democratic central committee members selected Wilson to serve the remainder of the mayoral term of Ben McAdams, who won election to Congress in the 2018 midterms and resigned to assume his congressional seat. She was sworn in on January 29, 2019 at the Salt Lake County Government Center.

In 2020, Wilson was re-elected to a full term as County Mayor, defeating Republican Riverton Mayor Trent Staggs by 37,463 votes.

In 2024 She was re-elected to a second full term, defeating Republican Erin Rider by 48,902 votes.

=== Tenure ===
Wilson has announced plans to form a new Office of Environmental Services in the county government to focus on improving air quality. Wilson has filed comments with the Utah state Supreme Court asking for DACA recipients (known as "Dreamers") to practice law in Utah.

== Personal life ==
Raised in Salt Lake City, one of five children, Wilson is the daughter of Ted Wilson, mayor of Salt Lake City from 1976–1985, and Kathy Wilson, an artist and small business owner. She graduated from East High School in 1983 and the University of Utah in 1988, and received a Masters in Public Administration from the John F. Kennedy School of Government in 1998. In 2013, she produced and directed a documentary film, The Grand Rescue, about a dramatic three-day rescue by park rangers, one of whom was her father, on the North Face of the Grand Teton.

Wilson and her husband, Trell Rohovit, have two children.

Party political offices
Preceded by Scott Howell	Democratic nominee for U.S. Senator from Utah (Class 1); 2018	Succeeded by Caroline Gleich
Political offices
Preceded by Ben McAdams	Mayor of Salt Lake County; 2019–present	Incumbent
