= Gerald J. Gleich =

- Gleich in 2022
- Born: May 14, 1931 (age 95); Michigan, US
- Education: University of Michigan – BA, MD
- Known for: Gleich's syndrome
- Children: seven, including Caroline Gleich
- Scientific career
- Fields: Immunology
- Workplaces: Mayo Clinic; University of Utah

Gerald J. Gleich is an American research professor at the University of Utah whose research has focused on eosinophils and allergic inflammatory reactions. He is board-certified by the American Board of Internal Medicine in internal medicine and the subtopic of allergy and immunology, as well as by the American Board of Allergy and Immunology.

== Early life and education ==
Gleich was born in Michigan in 1931. His parents were Gordon Joseph Gleich and Agnes (Ederer) Gleich.

He studied medicine at the University of Michigan. He did his medical internship and residency at Philadelphia General Hospital and Jackson Memorial Hospital. He had a research fellowship at Strong Memorial Hospital of the University of Rochester focused on allergies and immunology.

From 1957 to 1959, he also served as a flight surgeon in the United States Air Force, with the rank of captain.

== Career ==
In 1965, Gleich started researching allergies at the Mayo Clinic and Foundation. In 1982, he became the chair of the Department of Immunology, a Distinguished Investigator of the Mayo Foundation. In 1995, he was awarded the George M. Eisenberg Professorship of Medicine and Immunology. During his 36 years at the Mayo Clinic, he was involved in the 1979 update to the Surgeon General's ground-breaking report on Smoking and Health. In 2001, he moved to the University of Utah.

The main focus of his research was eosinophils, a type of white blood cell that is involved in some allergies and immune disorders. His lab's research demonstrated that degranulation of eosinophils causes the release of characteristic cytotoxic (cell-killing) and other substances, resulting in the identification of eosinophil-related disorders, including Gleich's syndrome, which was named after him. In 1993, he was elected as a Fellow of the American Association for the Advancement of Science for his research into the structure, biological properties and pathogenic role of the proteins in the cytoplasmic granules of eosinophils.

With Theresa Mansi, Steve Tullman, and other colleagues at the University of Utah, he co-founded NexEos Bio, a company developing diagnostic tools and treatments for eosinophil-related diseases.

== Awards and activities ==
=== Committees and boards ===
- Chair of the World Health Organization Subcommittee on Standardization of Allergens, 1974–1975
- Editorial board of the Journal of Allergy and Clinical Immunology
- Editorial board of the Journal of Immunology
- Member and chair of the Board of Scientific Counselors for the US National Institute of Allergy and Infectious Diseases (NIAID), 1981–1983
- Member and chair of the Immunological Sciences Study Section, US National Institutes of Health, 1984–1987
- Chair of the Data and Safety Monitoring Board of the US NIAID
- Member of board of directors of the American Partnership for Eosinophilic Disorders

=== Awards and honors ===
Gleich has received many awards, including:

- memberships in multiple academic honor societies: Phi Beta Kappa, Phi Kappa Phi, Alpha Omega Alpha and Sigma Xi;
- awards from research organizations such as the American Society for Clinical Investigation, the American Association of Immunologists, the Collegium Internationale Allergologicum, the Association of American Physicians, and the Mayo Clinic Distinguished Alumni Award;
- multiple named lectureships including from the American Academy of Allergy, Asthma and Immunology, the American Society of Parasitologists, and the Mayo Clinic;
- Fellowship award of the American Association for the Advancement of Science, 1990;
- Landmark in Allergy award, 1990;
- Lifetime Achievement Award from the International Eosinophil Society
- Fellow of the American College of Physicians, 1992;
- Named in the Highly Cited Researchers program.

== Publications ==
Gleich has published more than 700 journal articles.

- Gleich, Gerald J. (1993). Eosinophils in Allergy and Inflammation (1st ed.). Boca Raton: CRC Press (Taylor & Francis).

== Personal life ==
He has been married twice. He has seven children, including the environmentalist Caroline Gleich.
