= Gleich's syndrome =

- Other names: Episodic angioedema with eosinophilia

Gleich's syndrome, also known as episodic angioedema with eosinophilia, is a rare disease in which the body swells up episodically (angioedema), associated with raised antibodies of the IgM type and increased numbers of eosinophil granulocytes, a type of white blood cells, in the blood (eosinophilia). It was first described in 1984.

== Pathophysiology ==
Its cause is unknown, but it is unrelated to capillary leak syndrome (which may cause similar swelling episodes) and eosinophilia-myalgia syndrome (which features eosinophilia but alternative symptoms). Some studies have shown that edema attacks are associated with degranulation (release of enzymes and mediators from eosinophils), and others have demonstrated antibodies against endothelium (cells lining blood vessels) in the condition.

Gleich's syndrome is not a form of the idiopathic hypereosinophilic syndrome in that there is little or no evidence that it leads to organ damage. Rather, a subset of T cells (a special form of lymphocyte blood cell) found in several Gleich syndrome patients have an abnormal immunophenotype, i.e. they express CD3-, CD4+ cluster of differentiation cell surface antigens. These same aberrant T cell immunophenotypes are found in lymphocyte-variant eosinophilia, a disease in which the aberrant T cells overproduce cytokines such as interleukin 5 which simulate the proliferation of eosinophil precursor cells and are thereby responsible for the eosinophilia. It is suggested that most forms of Gleich's syndrome are due to a similar aberrant T cell mechanism and are a subtype of lymphocyte-variant eosinophilia.

== Prognosis ==
Gleich syndrome has a good prognosis. Attack severity may improve with steroid treatment. Other treatments used in eosinophil-related disorders have been tried, but mepolizumab (which blocks the interleukin 5 receptor) was not as effective as had been hoped. A survey of cases in France showed positive results from benralizumab (another IL-5 receptor inhibitor), ruxolitinib (a Janus kinase inhibitor), alemtuzumab, and romidepsin.

== Name ==
Gleich's syndrome is named for Gerald J. Gleich, a researcher focused on eosinophils.
