= Action Target =

Coordinates: 40.1929°N 111.6188°W

- Type: Private
- Industry: Manufacturing
- Founded: Provo, Utah, United States (1986)
- Founders: Kyle Bateman, Addison Sovine
- Headquarters: Provo, Utah, United States
- Area served: Worldwide
- Key people: Mike Birch, Kevin Tomaszewski, Tyler Webster, Scott Wright
- Products: Shooting ranges
- Services: Shooting range training
- Number of employees: 180–220
- Divisions: Academy; International; Law Enforcement; Military; Customer Service; Research and Development; Sales
- Website: http://www.actiontarget.com/

Action Target is an American manufacturer of custom shooting ranges and portable steel targets for military, law enforcement, Special Forces groups, tactical training schools, and commercial applications based in Provo, Utah. Since its founding in 1985, Action Target has increased its inventory to include over 4,000 products. The company designs, delivers, and installs indoor and outdoor range equipment throughout the world.

Mike Birch has been Chief Operating Officer since 2014. His predecessor, John Curtis, was a partner in the firm who was elected the mayor of Provo in 2008 and U.S. Representative for Utah's 3rd congressional district in 2016.

== History ==
Action Target was founded in 1986 by Kyle Bateman and Addison Sovine to address a need they saw with law enforcement training, and operated out of Bateman's bedroom at first. They soon moved to a larger facility near the Interstate 15 freeway in Provo before moving to a manufacturing facility nearby next to a residential neighborhood.

In 1989, the company moved into manufacturing facilities on the west side of Provo on a property formerly housed a wrecking yard. Throughout the next fifteen years, Action Target expanded and built several large buildings to house its manufacturing. In late 2003 or early 2004, the company donated land to Provo City in order to extend the street and provide an alternate route for delivery trucks, as well as offering to purchase properties to create a buffer zone between its facilities and those of residential neighbors.

The company produced two bullet-proof training villages for use by the U.S. Army in 2005, a contract worth $3 million. U.S. Congressman, Chris Cannon, participated in a demonstration of a similar facility created for use by Utah County police departments, including those from Provo, Brigham Young University, and Orem.

In 2007, the city of Provo began consideration of purchasing the property where Action Target was located in west Provo. The property owned by the company in west Provo was approved for purchase by the end of that same year. The city of Provo then approved several bonds in November as incentives for Action Target to move to a new industrial park in the southeast corner of the city.

The new industrial business park is the former home of an iron mill closed down in the 1960s. Provo City allowed Action Target to use its tax-exempt status to help secure financing for the costs of moving and building the new facility in the industrial park. The industrial park was part of an infrastructure improvement paid for by a $2 million federal grant.

After breaking ground in September 2008, the company began building a new facility which significantly increased its office space and manufacturing capacity. The new building allowed the company to have all their facilities in one location. They began moving into the new facility in August 2009 and officially opened the new facility in November that same year.

== Projects ==
Action Target has built some of the largest shooting ranges in the world, including the Federal Law Enforcement Training Center, the range at the FBI Academy, Sûreté du Québec, the United States Secret Service, and the Los Angeles Police Department Training Center. Between 2000 and 2008, the company was awarded $42.9 million in US government contracts. In late 2004, the company completed an 11-building training facility for use in Iraq by the multi-national forces stationed there. The company trains members of law enforcement agencies from around the world, according to its website.

== Environmental impact ==
Residential neighbors of Action Target's former facilities in west Provo often complained to police and to the city council in 2004 and 2005 about noise, paint fumes, and other pollution, as well as damage caused to fences by delivery trucks and firing of guns for testing. The company has been cited on at least one occasion.

Provo City followed up in June 2004 with a list of issues with which the company had to comply. Two local residents photographed employees of Action Target painting outside in September 2005, which they claimed was against the zoning for the area. The residents were members of a neighborhood watch program, and one was later dismissed from the program by the Provo Police. The new facility in southeast Provo is in an industrial business park with no residential areas nearby.

Action Target was mentioned in a 2009 USA Today report as emitting the chemical xylene, which has been shown to cause many different negative health effects.
