= 2024 Salt Lake County mayoral election =

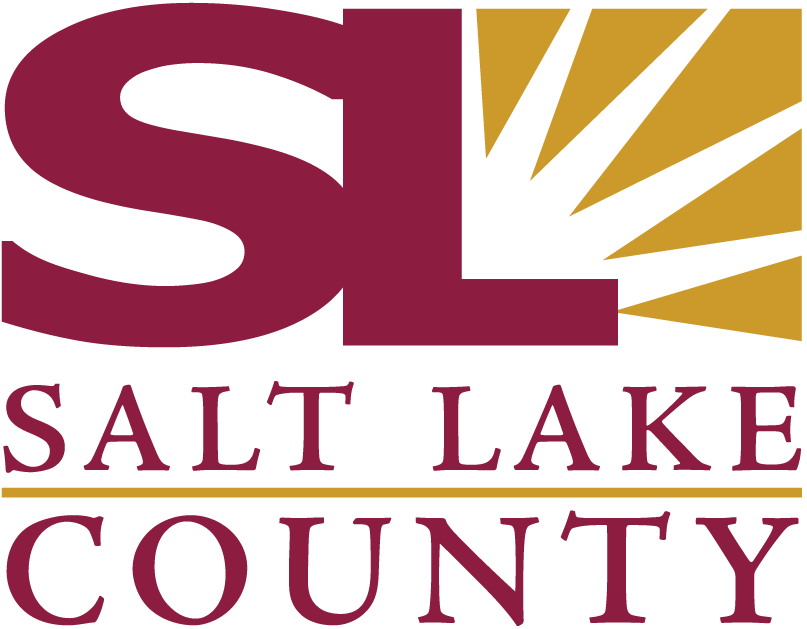
- November 5, 2024
	DEM	GOP
Nominee	Jenny Wilson	Erin Rider
Party	Democratic	Republican
Popular vote	273,227	224,325
Percentage	54.91%	45.09%
Mayor before election
Jenny Wilson
Democratic
Elected mayor
Jenny Wilson
Democratic

The 2024 Salt Lake County mayoral election was held on November 5, 2024, alongside elections to the Salt Lake County Council. Incumbent Democratic mayor Jenny Wilson was re-elected to a second full term, defeating Republican challenger Erin Rider.

== Democratic convention ==
=== Nominee ===
- Jenny Wilson, incumbent mayor (2019–present)

=== Campaign ===
Incumbent mayor Jenny Wilson was unopposed for the Democratic Party nomination.

== Republican convention ==
=== Nominee ===
- Erin Rider, attorney and candidate for Utah's 2nd congressional district in 2022

=== Eliminated at convention ===
- Yianni "John" Ioannou, director of the Salt Lake County Landfill (2007–present)

=== Results ===
2024 Salt Lake County mayoral election (Republican convention)
Party	Candidate	Votes	%
Republican	Erin Rider	1,036	77.37%
Republican	Yianni "John" Ioannou	303	22.63%
Total votes		1,339	100.00%

== General election ==
=== Results ===
2024 Salt Lake County mayoral election
Party	Candidate	Votes	%	±%
Democratic	Jenny Wilson (incumbent)	273,227	54.91%	+3.03%
Republican	Erin Rider	224,325	45.09%	+0.31%
Total votes		497,552	100.00%	-5.48%
