= Conservative Climate Caucus =

Caucus within the US House of Representatives

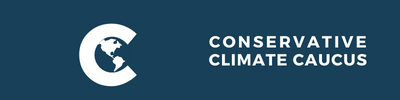
- Chair: Mariannette Miller-Meeks
- Founded: 2021
- Headquarters: 2323 Rayburn HOB Washington, D.C.
- Ideology: Green conservatism
- Seats in the House Republican Conference: 66 / 218
- Seats in the House: 66 / 435

Website
- Conservative Climate Caucus

The Conservative Climate Caucus is a caucus within the United States House of Representatives composed of 66 members, all of the Republican Party. Its founder and first chairman was U.S. Senator (then Representative) John Curtis (R-Utah) during the 117th United States Congress in 2021. The caucus's self-declared purpose is to "Educate House Republicans on climate policies and legislation consistent with conservative values".

As of 2025, the caucus is chaired by Rep. Mariannette Miller-Meeks (R-IA).

== History ==
The Conservative Climate Caucus was formed in 2021 by Representative John Curtis and a group of 52 Republican lawmakers concerned with the growing public and scientific consensus on the risks posed by climate change and the need for action. This included the acknowledgement of "decades of a global industrial era that has brought prosperity to the world has also contributed to that change.” The formation was a response to both environmental concerns and a recognition of the political imperative for conservatives to engage with the climate policy debate.

Curtis left the House in preparation for the 2024 United States Senate election in Utah.

== Mission ==
The mission of the Conservative Climate Caucus is to educate Republican members of Congress on climate policies and legislation that are in line with conservative values, including free-market based solutions and private sector innovation. The CCC aims to harness innovation and American entrepreneurial spirit to address climate change, prioritizing energy independence, job creation, and land stewardship.

== Activities ==
Caucus activities include holding meetings, briefing members on climate science and policy, and engaging with stakeholders. The Caucus participates in the annual United Nations Climate Change conference.

The caucus has advocated for the protection of subsidies for biofuel, carbon-capture and clean energy tax credits as well as the development of EV and battery plant infrastructure.

In 2024, the American Energy Alliance, a conservative energy advocacy group, spent $100,000 on digital advertisements claiming that Curtis and other republican cosponsors wanted to "make energy more expensive" for supporting the bipartisan PROVE IT Act to study the carbon intensity of more than 20 industrial products

== Current members ==
The map shows districts represented by Conservative Climate Caucus members as of April 2024.

The membership of the Conservative Climate Caucus includes a cross-section of the Republican Party, featuring members from diverse geographic regions and committees. The caucus includes members of the House of Representatives and is open to the Republican Conference.

State	District	Member	CPVI
Alabama	AL‑2	Barry Moore	R+15
Arizona	AZ‑1	David Schweikert	R+1
Arizona	AZ‑6	Juan Ciscomani (Vice Chair)	EVEN
Arizona	AZ‑8	Debbie Lesko	R+8
Arizona	AZ‑9	Paul Gosar	R+15
Arkansas	AR‑1	Rick Crawford	R+14
Arkansas	AR‑2	French Hill	R+12
Arkansas	AR‑4	Bruce Westerman	R+20
California	CA‑22	David Valadao	R+1
California	CA‑23	Jay Obernolte	R+8
California	CA‑40	Young Kim	R+1
Florida	FL‑2	Neal Dunn	R+14
Florida	FL‑5	John Rutherford	R+15
Florida	FL‑26	Mario Diaz-Balart	R+9
Florida	FL‑27	Maria Elvira Salazar	R+7
Florida	FL‑28	Carlos A. Giménez	R+5
Georgia	GA‑1	Buddy Carter (Vice Chair)	R+16
Illinois	IL‑16	Darin LaHood	R+10
Indiana	IN‑4	Jim Baird	R+16
Indiana	IN‑8	Larry Bucshon	R+17
Iowa	IA‑1	Mariannette Miller-Meeks (Chair)	R+3
Iowa	IA‑4	Randy Feenstra	R+13
Kentucky	KY‑2	Brett Guthrie	R+16
Kentucky	KY‑6	Andy Barr	R+12
Michigan	MI‑1	Jack Bergman	R+14
Michigan	MI‑4	Bill Huizenga	R+10
Michigan	MI‑5	Tim Walberg (Vice Chair)	R+10
Minnesota	MN‑8	Pete Stauber	R+7
Nebraska	NE‑2	Don Bacon	R+7
Nevada	NV‑2	Mark Amodei	R+7
New Jersey	NJ‑2	Jeff Van Drew	R+5
New Jersey	NJ‑7	Thomas Kean	R+3
New York	NY‑1	Nick LaLota	R+4
New York	NY‑2	Andrew Garbarino	R+6
New York	NY‑11	Nicole Malliotakis	R+10
New York	NY‑17	Mike Lawler	D+1
North Carolina	NC‑3	Greg Murphy (Vice Chair)	R+13
North Carolina	NC‑9	Richard Hudson	R+10
North Carolina	NC‑11	Chuck Edwards	R+5
Ohio	OH‑5	Robert Latta	R+8
Ohio	OH‑12	Troy Balderson	R+14
Ohio	OH‑14	David Joyce	R+9
Oklahoma	OK‑3	Frank Lucas	R+20
Oklahoma	OK‑5	Stephanie Bice	R+12
Oregon	OR‑2	Cliff Bentz	R+14
Pennsylvania	PA‑15	Glenn Thompson	R+19
South Carolina	SC‑1	Nancy Mace	R+9
South Carolina	SC‑4	William Timmons	R+11
South Carolina	SC‑5	Jeff Duncan	R+19
South Dakota	SD‑AL	Dusty Johnson	R+15
Tennessee	TN‑2	Tim Burchett	R+13
Tennessee	TN‑3	Chuck Fleischmann	R+18
Texas	TX‑1	Nathan Moran	R+25
Texas	TX‑2	Dan Crenshaw	R+11
Texas	TX‑4	Pat Fallon	R+16
Texas	TX‑10	Michael McCaul	R+12
Texas	TX‑11	August Pfluger	R+22
Texas	TX‑14	Randy Weber	R+17
Texas	TX‑17	Pete Sessions	R+14
Texas	TX‑19	Jodey Arrington	R+25
Texas	TX‑23	Tony Gonzales	R+7
Texas	TX‑27	Michael Cloud	R+14
Texas	TX‑31	John Carter	R+11
Utah	UT‑1	Blake Moore	R+10
Virginia	VA‑1	Rob Wittman	R+3
Virginia	VA‑2	Jen Kiggans (Vice Chair)	EVEN
Virginia	VA‑9	Morgan Griffith	R+22
Washington	WA‑4	Dan Newhouse	R+10
Wisconsin	WI‑1	Bryan Steil	R+2
Wisconsin	WI‑3	Derrick Van Orden	R+3

== Past members ==
Notable past members include:

- John Curtis (UT-03) caucus founder, junior senator from Utah
- Markwayne Mullin (OK-02), junior senator from Oklahoma
- Lee Zeldin (NY-01), 17th administrator of the Environmental Protection Agency
