= Trent Staggs =

American politician (born 1974)

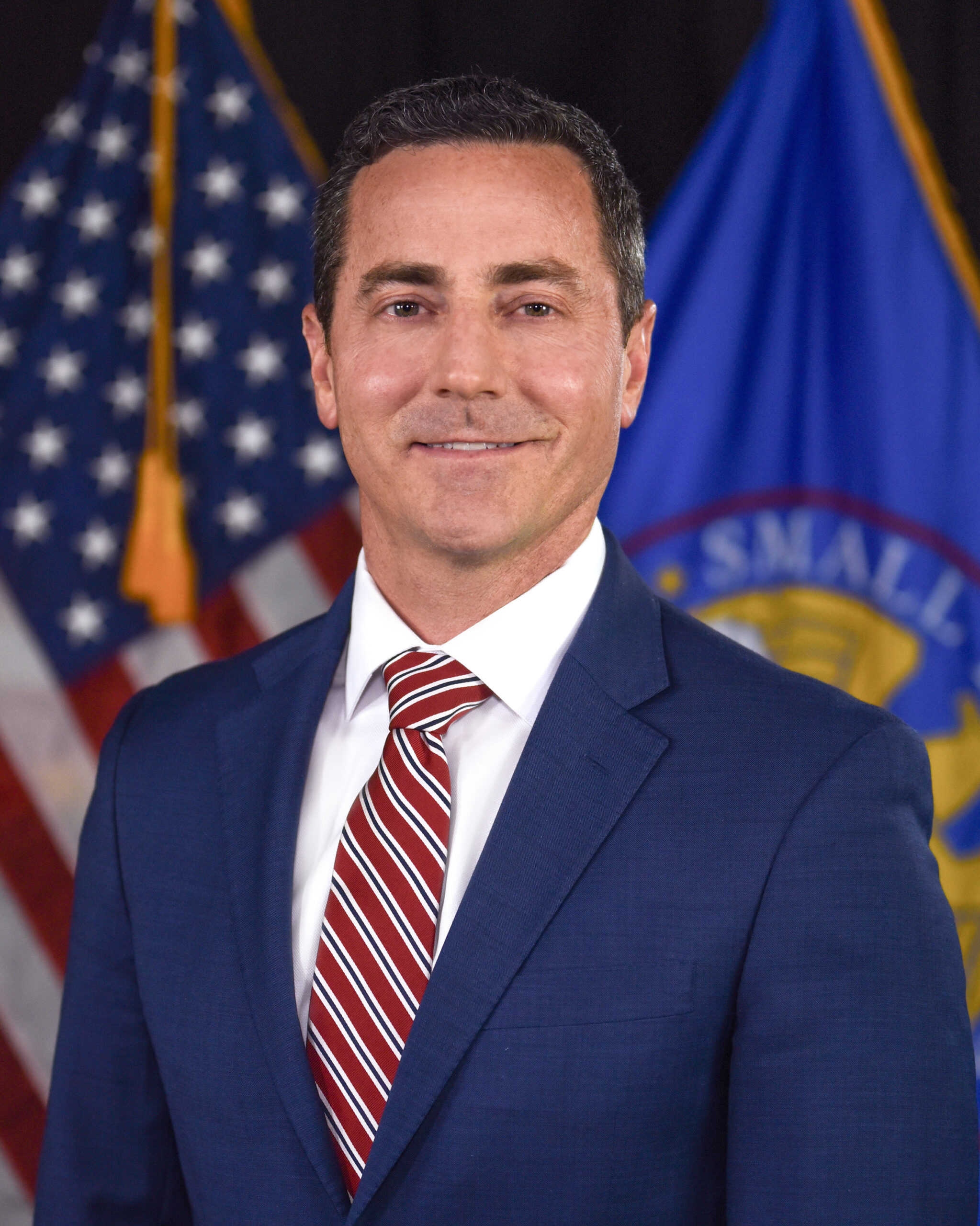
- Official portrait, 2025

Mayor of Riverton
- In office January 2018 – January 2026
- Preceded by: Bill Applegarth
- Succeeded by: Tish Buroker

Member of the Riverton City Council from the 4th district
- In office 2014 – January, 2018
- Preceded by: Al Leavitt
- Succeeded by: Tish Buroker

Personal details
- Born: Trent Phillip Staggs; May 10, 1974 (age 52) Orem, Utah, U.S.
- Party: Republican
- Spouse: Alisha Staggs
- Children: 2
- Education: University of Utah (BA); Brigham Young University (MBA)
- Website: Campaign website

Trent Phillip Staggs (born May 10, 1974) is an American entrepreneur and politician who served as the mayor of Riverton, Utah, from 2018 to 2026. A member of the Republican Party, he previously served on the Riverton City Council and was a candidate for the United States Senate.

== Early life and career ==
Staggs was raised in Orem, Utah, as one of 10 children. He graduated from Bingham High School in South Jordan, Utah, and served a mission for The Church of Jesus Christ of Latter-day Saints in Tahiti. He graduated from the University of Utah with degrees in political science and economics. He later earned an MBA from the Marriott School of Management at Brigham Young University. He is married and has two children.

== Member of the Riverton City Council (2014–2018) ==
In 2013, Staggs was elected to the Riverton City Council for the 4th district.

== Mayor of Riverton (2018–2026) ==
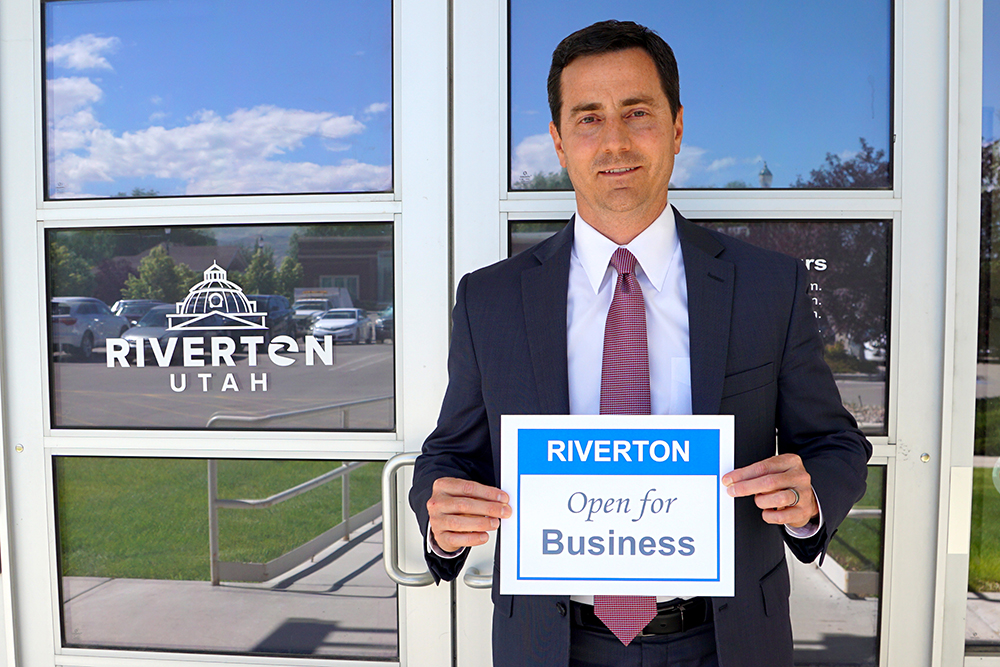
Staggs in 2018

Staggs was elected mayor of Riverton in 2017 with 60% of the vote. In 2020, he was the Republican nominee for mayor of Salt Lake County, Utah. He lost to Democrat Jenny Wilson. In 2021, he was re-elected Riverton mayor unopposed.

Staggs left the Unified Police Department (UPD) of Greater Salt Lake in favor if one that serves exclusively Riverton City, based on concerns that low-crime cities in Salt Lake County, like Riverton, were paying too much for the service and not seeing an increase in the number of officers. In June 2019, the city swore in 35 officers for the new police department. He also led an initiative to reduce misuse of opioids in the city in partnership with Utah-based medication disposal organization called NarcX.

In 2019, he rejected a proposal that would have increased the salary of the Riverton mayor.

In 2023, he was named best mayor in Utah by the Best of State organization.

Adhering to his belief in term limits, Staggs did not run for reelection in 2025.

== 2024 U.S. Senate election in Utah ==
In May, Staggs became the first person to officially announce his candidacy for the U.S. Senate. In an op-ed for Real Clear Politics in June 2023, Staggs wrote that “If our children are going to grow up with the same opportunities we had, we need leaders who are committed to the conservative principles of smaller government, safer families, and stronger economy.”

At the Utah state Republican convention on April 27, Staggs won 69.7% of the delegate vote to become the party's official candidate in a four-way primary in June.

Staggs's campaign was endorsed by Donald Trump, Sen. Tommy Tuberville, Sen. Rand Paul, Vivek Ramaswamy, Rep. Andy Biggs, Rep. Matt Gaetz, Kari Lake, Charlie Kirk, former Trump Administration officials Kash Patel and Ric Grenell, the Utah Republican Veterans’ caucus, the Utah State Fraternal Order of Police, more than 30 elected officials from across Utah, and NBA all time steals and assists leader John Stockton.

In the primary on June 24, Staggs lost the nomination to U.S. Representative John Curtis, placing second with 32% of the vote.

== Trump administration ==
In May 2025, Staggs was appointed as a regional advocate in the Small Business Administration's Office of Advocacy, where he is one of 10 regional advocates within SBA tasked with working with businesses and local leaders to support small business growth.
