= Citizens for Responsible Energy Solutions =

American nonprofit organization

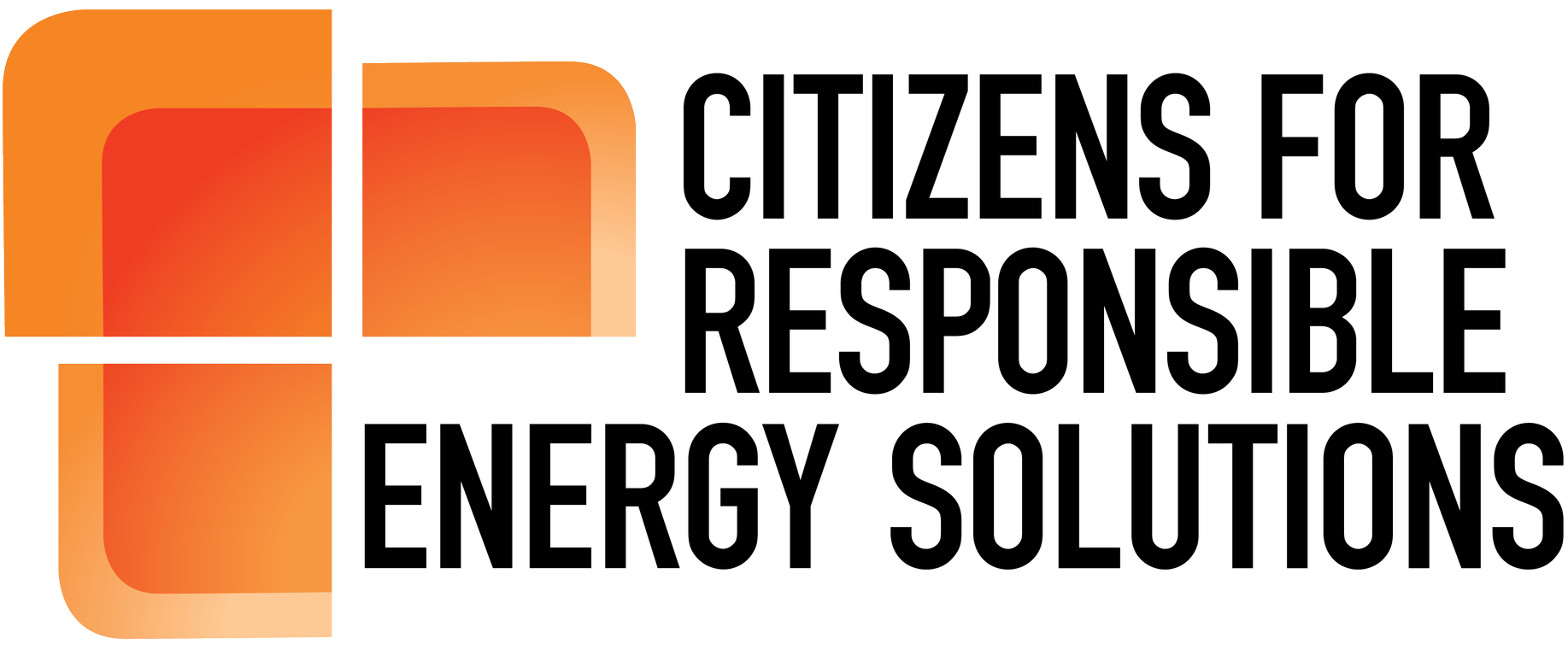
- Abbreviation: CRES
- Founder: James Dozier
- Legal status: 501c4
- Purpose: To educate Republican policymakers and the public about clean energy
- Location: Washington, DC, United States
- President: Heather Reams
- Affiliations: CRES Forum, Clean Energy Bootcamp, Congressional Conservative Climate Caucus, National Clean Energy Week
- Website: cresenergy.com

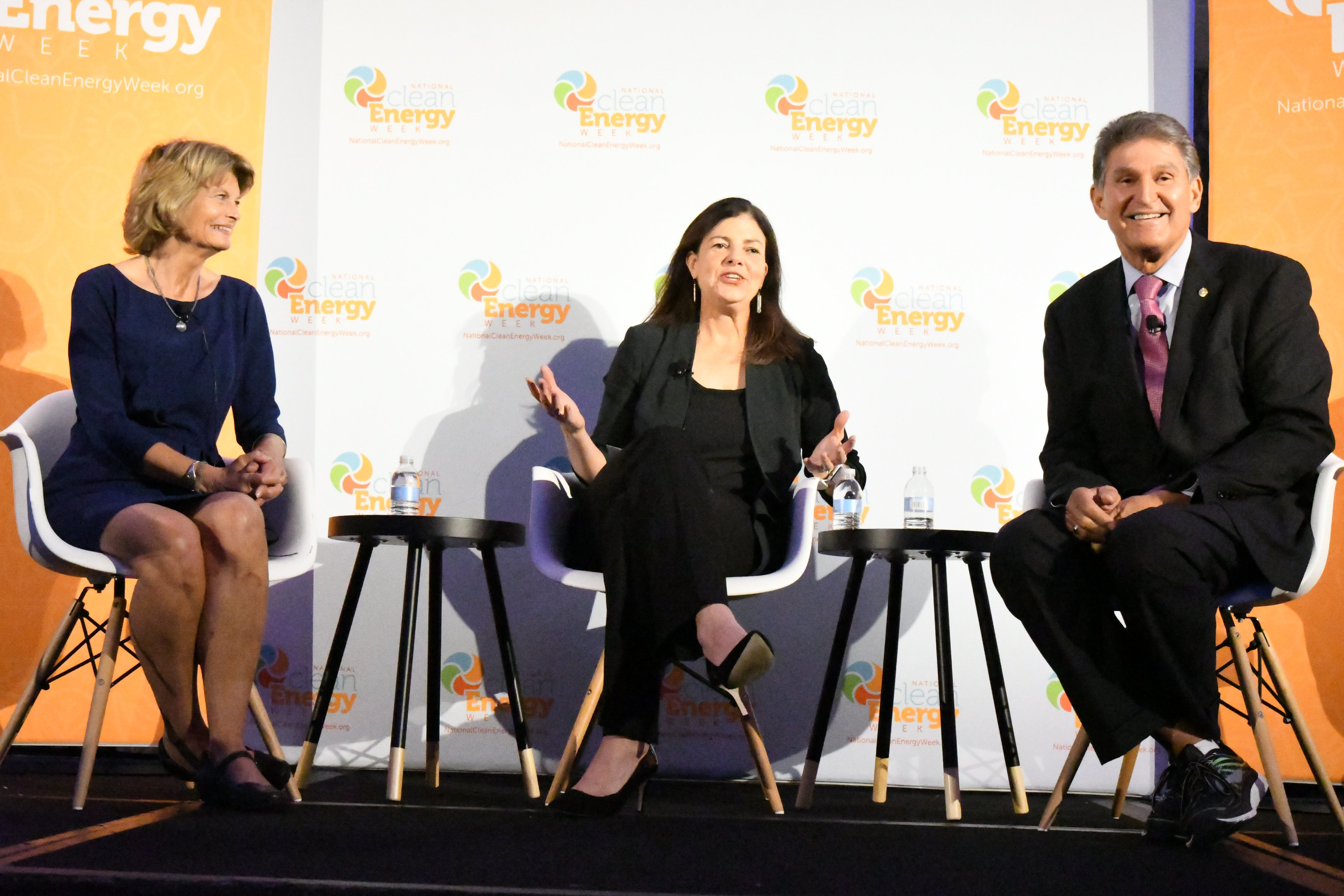
Lisa Murkowski, Kelly Ayotte and Joe Manchin discussing clean energy solutions at a CRES event in 2019

Citizens for Responsible Energy Solutions (CRES) is a non-profit organization based in Washington, D.C. that advocates for a clean energy policy of the United States. CRES was founded in 2013 to engage Republican lawmakers in the national conversation about clean energy and promote the concept of energy policy as a nonpartisan issue.

== History ==
CRES was founded by Republican grassroots organizer James Dozier in 2013. In 2017, former U.S. Senator Kelly Ayotte was named as the organization's senior advisor.

CRES announced Managing Director Heather Reams' promotion to executive director. In 2022 Heather Reams was promoted to president at CRES.

In 2018 CRES received a $1 million grant from the MacArthur Foundation. CRES has also received funding from industry groups.

CRES formed the House Clean Energy and Innovation Working Group and the Senate Energy and Environment Working Group to help lawmakers collaborate on clean energy policy. In June 2021, CRES supported the formation of the Conservative Climate Caucus—a 60-member organization introduced by U.S. Representative John Curtis (R-UT-03) to educate lawmakers on conservative climate policies.

In October 2021, CRES partnered with ClearPath to organize a trip for Republican lawmakers to attend the 2021 United Nations Climate Change Conference in Glasgow, Scotland (COP26) marking the first time a Republican-only delegation attended a UN climate conference.

== Research ==
In 2019, CRES worked with ClearPath to release a white paper, "Clean Energy Solutions Must Include Nuclear," in cooperation with fellow energy organizations ClearPath, Center for Climate and Energy Solutions, and American Council for Capital Formation. In 2022, CRES Forum, the policy arm of CRES, released a white paper series titled, "Understanding the Facts." Based on eight conservative climate policy directives, the series covered various topics within the clean energy space to support "all of the above" solutions to curb greenhouse gas emissions. Examples of such topics included mineral constraints, Chinese emissions, intra-fuel switching, and progress within the U.S. power sector.

The organization also publishes polls that analyzes voters' sentiments toward clean energy policies and the elected officials who support those solutions. A June 2020 poll conducted by CRES revealed that Republican voters agree with Democrats and independent voters that the government should address climate change and environmental issues. A February 2020 poll showed that over two-thirds of young voters were more likely to vote for a Republican candidate who states that climate change is real. A 2021 poll indicated that nearly three-quarters of Americans, including more than half of Republicans, support government action to boost clean energy development. In 2022, CRES commissioned a 1,000 person survey conducted by Public Opinion Strategies. The poll found that sixty percent of voters support the federal government taking more action to address climate change, and that there is increased support for such action amongst Republican and Independent voters as compared to earlier polls.

== Political positions ==
CRES works with clean energy policy and weighs in on other issue areas as they relate to clean energy, such as the Paris Agreement.

In 2017 CRES had an ad campaign directed at President Trump to either stay in the Paris climate accords, or to renegotiate.

On November 29, 2018, CRES was one of many energy organizations who co-signed a letter to the US Senate and House leaderships, advocating for a modified tax code that would allow energy storage technology to be eligible for the Investment Tax Credit. The organization is against charging companies which emit carbon, but supports paying farmers and foresters to remove it via the proposed "Growing Climate Solutions Act".

== Politicians CRES has endorsed ==
- Mark Amodei
- Susan Collins
- Carlos Curbelo
- Brian Fitzpatrick
- Cory Gardner
- Ed Gillespie
- Lindsey Graham
- Gary Herbert
- Larry Hogan
- John Katko
- Mia Love
- Lisa Murkowski
- Tom Reed
- Kim Reynolds
- Cathy McMorris Rodgers
- Brian Sandoval
- Tim Scott
- Elise Stefanik
- Thom Tillis
- Jill Vogel
