= 2020 Salt Lake County mayoral election =

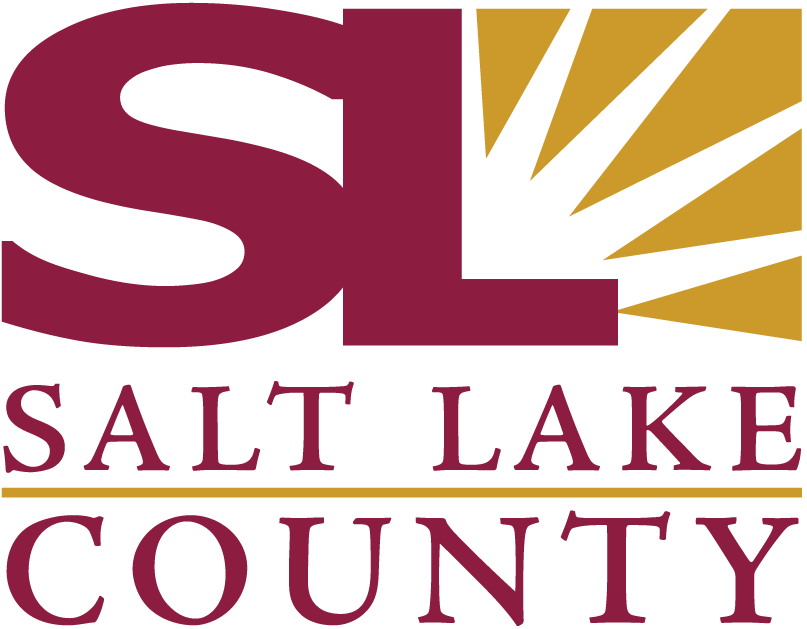
- November 3, 2020
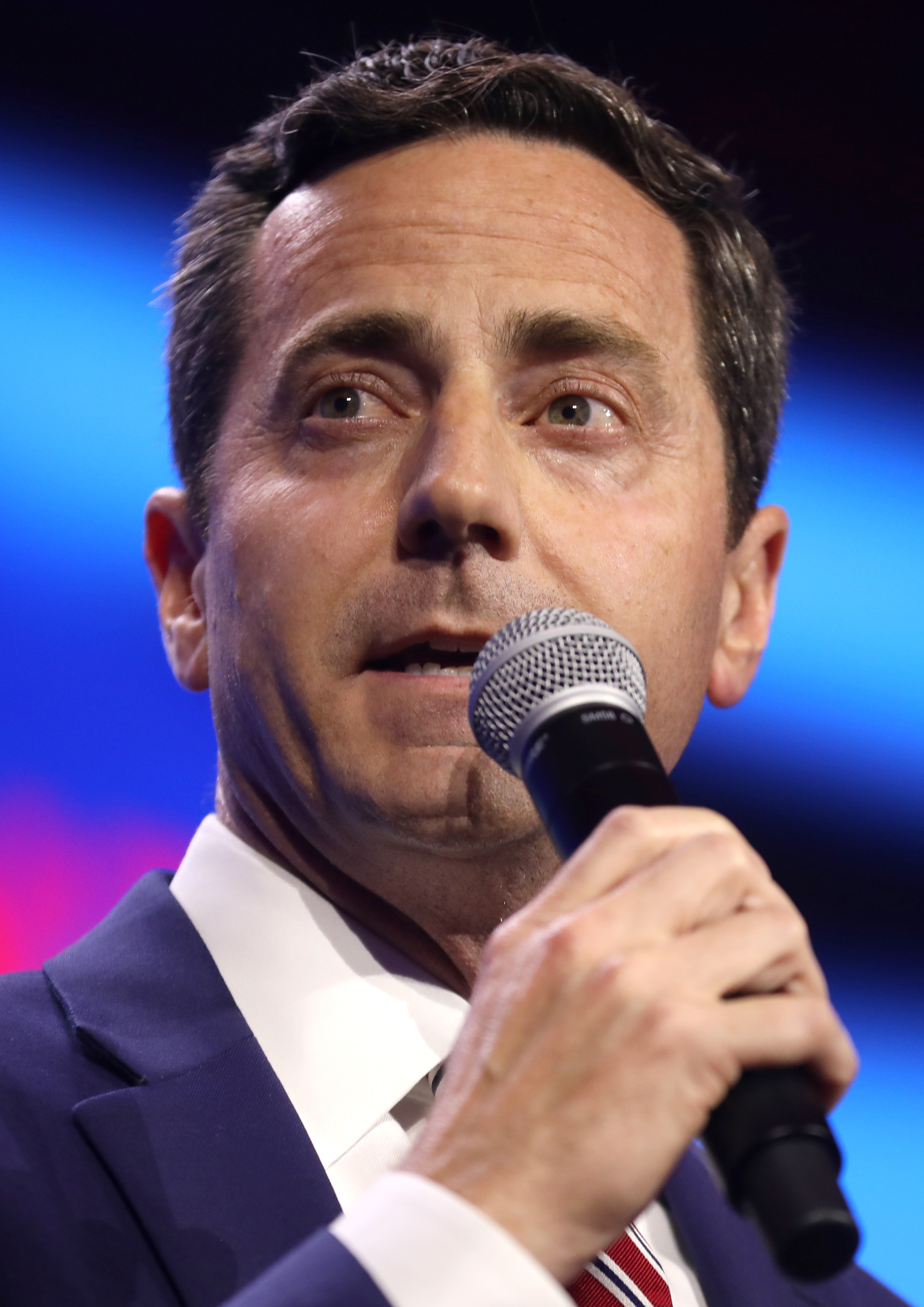
Candidate	Jenny Wilson	Trent Staggs
Party	Democratic	Republican
Popular vote	273,746	236,283
Percentage	51.9%	44.8%
- Results by precinct
Mayor before election
Jenny Wilson
Democratic
Elected mayor
Jenny Wilson
Democratic

The 2020 Salt Lake County mayoral election was held to elect the next mayor of Salt Lake County, Utah on November 3, 2020, alongside the presidential, House of Representatives and gubernatorial elections. This marked the sixth election to the office since the post was created in 2000.

On January 2, 2019, incumbent two-term County Mayor, Democrat Ben McAdams, resigned after being elected to represent Utah's 4th congressional district, triggering a 30-day deadline for the Salt Lake County Democratic Party Central Committee to vote for the replacement mayor. On January 26, 2019, the Committee elected county councilwoman at-large Jenny Wilson, unsuccessful 2018 Senate candidate, to succeed McAdams. No primary elections were held. Wilson was re-elected to a full term, beating Republican candidate, Riverton city Mayor Trent Staggs in the general election.

== Candidates ==
=== Democratic Party ===
- Jenny Wilson, incumbent County Mayor

=== Republican Party ===
- Trent Staggs, Mayor of Riverton, Utah

=== Green Party ===
- Michael W. Cundick, environmental activist

== Results ==
2020 Salt Lake County mayoral general election results
Party	Candidate	Votes	%	±%
Democratic	Jenny Wilson (incumbent)	273,746	51.88	−7.48%
Republican	Trent Staggs	236,283	44.78	+4.14%
Green	Michael Cundick	17,556	3.34	+3.34%
Total votes		526,388	100.00	+30.78%
