= Fairness for High Skilled Immigrants Act =

Proposed United States federal legislation

Equal Access to Green cards for Legal Employment Act
- Long title: An Act to amend the Immigration and Nationality Act to eliminate the per-country numerical limitation for employment-based immigrants, to raise the per-country numerical limitation for family-sponsored immigrants, and for other purposes

The Fairness for High Skilled Immigrants Act or 'Equal Access to Green cards for Legal Employment Act or Immigration Visa Efficiency and Security Act are proposed United States federal legislation that would reform U.S. immigration policy, by removing per-country limitations on employment-based visas, increasing the per-country numerical limitation for family-sponsored immigrants, and for other purposes without increasing the number of visas allocated under existing law. It also reforms the H-1B and L-1 program by increasing the minimum wage and instituting series of new regulation to weed out abuse and prioritize American Workers. In 2020, the legislation passed both the House and Senate for the first time. However, the versions differed and required reconciliation, which could not be completed before the 116th Congress ended due to time constraints. To move forward, the legislation had to be reintroduced in the 117th Congress. Following the conclusion of the 117th Congress, it has now been reintroduced in the 118th Congress.

== Objective ==
The bill intends to amend the Immigration and Nationality Act to:
(1) eliminate the per country numerical limitation for employment-based immigrants without increasing number of visas allocated
(2) increase the per country numerical limitation for family based immigrants from 7% to 15% of the total number of family-sponsored visas without increasing number of visas allocated
(3) Implement a set of new regulations for the H-1B and L-1 programs by targeting outsourcing companies, imposing stricter requirements for hiring H-1B workers, raising the minimum wage, and adjusting it for inflation every three years

== History ==
The legislation to eliminate per country caps on employment based green cards was first introduced by Rep. Lofgren, Zoe and Bob Goodlatte in the 110th congress [2007-2008] , which intended to eliminate the 7% annual numerical cap on applicants' birth country in the US Employment based immigration. It has been introduced by various law-makers with bi-partisan support in almost every congress since then, either as a stand-alone bill or as an amendment with other bill.

The legislation was also included in 2 major attempts at comprehensive immigration reform both under President Obama in 2013 and President Trump in 2018.

The bills provision was also included in the 2018 comprehensive bill led by House Republicans, H.R. 6136, the Border Security and Immigration Reform Act of 2018. The bill received strong backing from President Donald Trump, who framed it as a cornerstone of his immigration policy agenda. The administration emphasized its alignment with Trump’s "four pillars" for immigration reform. Immigration restrictionist groups also supported the bill due to its provisions to eliminate "catch and release," tighten asylum standards, and restrict family-based immigration, which aligned with their goals of reducing overall immigration levels.

Year	Congress	Bill no.	Sponsor / original sponsors	Co-sponsors	Status
2007-2008	110th	"H.R.5921". 3 June 2008.	Rep. Lofgren [D-CA-19] and Rep. Goodlatte [R-VA-6]	24	Introduced in House
2011-2012	112th	"S.1983". 13 December 2011.	Sen. Schumer [D-NY] and 5 others	5	Introduced in Senate
2011-2012	112th	"S.1857". 10 November 2011.	Sen. Lee [R-UT]	0	Introduced in Senate
2011-2012	112th	"H.R.3012". 23 January 2012.	Rep. Chaffetz [R-UT-3]	11	Passed House
2013-2014	113th	"S.293". 13 February 2013.	Sen. Lee [R-UT]	0	Introduced in Senate
2013-2014	113th	"H.R.633". 8 April 2013.	Rep. Chaffetz [R-UT-3], Rep. Lofgren [D-CA-19] and 1 other	14	Introduced in House
2015-2016	114th	"H.R.213". 2 February 2015.	Rep. Chaffetz [R-UT-3], Rep. Lofgren [D-CA-19] and 1 other	147	Introduced in House
2017-2018	115th	"H.R.670". 8 February 2017.	Rep. Lofgren [D-CA-19]	0	Introduced in House
2017-2018	115th	"H.R.392". 11 July 2017.	Rep. Chaffetz [R-UT-3], Rep. O'Rourke [D-TX-16] and 24 others	329	Introduced in House
2017-2018	115th	"S.281". 2 February 2017.	Sen. Lee [R-UT]	20	Introduced in Senate
2019-2020	116th	"S.386". 9 July 2019.	Sen. Lee [R-UT], Sen. Harris [D-CA] and 13 others	35	Introduced in Senate- House version of the bill passed senate unanimously with amendments
2019-2020	116th	"H.R.1044". 3 December 2020.	Rep. Lofgren [D-CA-19], Rep. Buck [R-CO-4] and 115 others	311	Passed House and Senate
2021-2022	117th	"S.4567". 20 July 2022.			Introduced in Senate
2021-2022	117th	"H.R.3648". 7 June 2022.			Reported (Amended) by the Committee on Judiciary

== H.R.392 - Fairness for High-Skilled Immigrants Act of 2017 ==
The bill, H.R.392 was originally introduced in the U.S. House of Representatives in January 2017 by Representative Chaffetz. On July 11, 2017, Representative Yoder assumed first sponsorship of H.R.392 with unanimous consent, for the purpose of adding cosponsors and requesting reprintings pursuant to clause 7 of rule XII, without objection. The bill got 329 cosponsors, which includes 25 original sponsors.

=== Bill summary ===
This bill amends the Immigration and Nationality Act to: (1) eliminate the per-country numerical limitation for employment-based immigrants, and (2) increase the per-country numerical limitation for family-based immigrants from 7% to 15% of the total number of family-sponsored visas. The Chinese Student Protection Act of 1992 is amended to eliminate the provision requiring the reduction of annual Chinese immigrant visas to offset status adjustments under such Act.

The bill establishes a transition period during which a percentage of employment-based second and third preference (EB-2 and EB-3) immigrant visas are reserved as follows 1. for FY2017, 15% of the annual employment based visas are reserved for non-backlogged countries 2. for FY2018, 10% of the annual employment based visas are reserved for non-backlogged countries 3. for FY2019. 10% of the annual employment based visas are reserved for non-backlogged countries During the transition period, not more than 25% of the total number of the reserved EB-2 and EB-3 visas shall be allotted to natives of a single country.

== H.R.1044 : Fairness for High-Skilled Immigrants Act of 2020 ==
The bill, H.R. 1044, was introduced in the U.S. House of Representatives in February 2019 by Democratic Congresswoman Zoe Lofgren and Representative Ken Buck. It was considered and substantially amended in the U.S. Senate (S.386) which passed unanimously led by Senator Mike Lee . The two versions of the bill differed such that they had to be reconciled in conference committee prior to final passage and signature by the President. Congressional proponents sought an alternative procedural approach to passage of the bill of placing key provision of the bill into an omnibus spending bill. However, on December 21, 2020, Congresswoman Lofgren issued a statement which indicates that Congress was not able to reconcile the House and Senate versions of the bill, nor attach key provisions to the omnibus spending bill prior to the end of the 2019-2020 congressional calendar. This statement was an apparent concession that the bill had no realistic possibility of passage in its then-current form in the 116th Congress, but Lofgren's statement does seem to imply that she will reintroduce similar legislation in the future.

=== Key provisions ===
==== Per-country employment-based visa limitation ====
In the 1924, Congress imposed the first-ever quota on US immigration, but rather than just a worldwide limit, it also distributed the numbers between countries in order to give preference to immigrants from Eastern Hemisphere. In 1965, Congress repealed this system with one that allowed immigrants from any country to receive up to a maximum of seven percent of the green cards issued each year. Prospective employment-based Immigrants born in countries with large populations, have wait times from decades to over a century, while the Immigrants born in lower population countries might wait as little as a year or less for their employment-based visas. The primary proposal of this bill is to eliminate the birth country reservation on employment-based visas to prioritize the immigrant petitions based on their application date in all employment-based immigration categories without increasing the annual limit of 1 million Green cards a year. If enacted, this bill would create equal wait time for immigrants in employment-based visas irrespective of where they were born.

The backlog in green card processing can be attributed to the fact that, of the roughly 1 million green cards allocated each year, only 14% (approximately 140,000) are designated for the employment-based skilled immigration pathway. The remaining green cards are allocated to family-based chain migration and humanitarian programs. Common employment pathways, such as student visas, H-1B, and O-1 visas, do not have country-specific caps, but the green cards to which these visa holders eventually transition do. This results in families who are already living and working in the United States being stuck in a state of uncertainty as they wait for their green cards.

==== Per-country family-based visa limitation ====
Family-based visas allow for U.S. citizens and lawful permanent residents, or "green card" holders, to assist family members from abroad in obtaining a lawful entry – U.S. citizens can bring more distant relatives. Current U.S. immigration law limits family-based immigrant visas to 7% from any given country. The bill raise the limit to 15% without increasing the number of allocated visas. This will primarily benefit long-backlogged immigrants from Mexico and the Philippines.

==== Transition period ====
The House and Senate versions of the bill both contain transition, or "phase-out" timelines that reserve a percentage of EB-2 and EB-3 green cards for immigrants of non-Chinese or Indian origin. The two versions differ substantially in the length of this transition period, with the House version being three years, and the Senate version being eleven years.

=== Legislative history ===
- 02/07/2019 - Introduced in House led by Rep Zoe Lofgren
- 02/07/2019 - Introduced in Senate led by Senator Mike Lee
- 06/27/2019 - Senator Rand Paul Blocked Unanimous Consent to create a visa carve-out for nurses
- 07/10/2019 - Passed/agreed to in House: On motion to suspend the rules and pass the bill, as amended Agreed to by the Yeas and Nays: (2/3 required): 365 - 65 (Roll no. 437).
- 07/19/2019 - Senator Chuck Grassley amended S386 to include provisions to the reform the H-1B program and labor condition applications.
- 09/19/2019 - Senator David Perdue Blocked Unanimous Consent.
- 10/17/2019 - Senator Dick Durbin Blocked Unanimous Consent.
- 08/05/2020 - Senator Dick Durbin amended S386 and released the hold.
- 08/05/2020 - Senator Rick Scott Blocks Durbin, Lee Compromise Unanimous Consent.
- 12/02/2020 - Senate Committee on the Judiciary discharged by Unanimous Consent.
- 12/02/2020 - Passed/agreed to in Senate: Passed Senate with Lee amendment by Voice Vote.

== Support ==
Support for the legislation primarily stems from U.S. science and technology firms, notably Silicon Valley, which recruit skilled immigrants from countries like India and China in STEM fields. These companies face frustrations due to bureaucratic hurdles for their immigrant employees and their families for obtaining a green card which restrict their ability to change jobs, start businesses.

Advocates highlight it a critical step forward in modernizing the H-1B and L-1 visa programs to weed out fraud and abuse. By raising the minimum wage for H-1B visa holders and indexing it to inflation, the bill addresses the longstanding concern of wage suppression, ensuring that foreign workers are not exploited at the expense of American labor. Moreover, the Act introduces vital new regulations that crack down on the abuse of outsourcing companies.

== Opposition ==
Opponents of the legislation argue that eliminating per-country employment-based limits without increasing visas would benefit Indian and Chinese immigrants at the expense of both immigrants from smaller countries, and thereby reduce diversity in employment based immigration. The left-leaning American Immigration Lawyer Association states that they are "long time, ardent supporter of the elimination of the per-country limitations for employment-based immigrants because individuals should become permanent residents based on the skills they bring to the United States and not their nationality.", but opposed it because it does not increases the total number of visas.
