= Caroline Gleich =

American skier, mountaineer, and activist (born 1985)

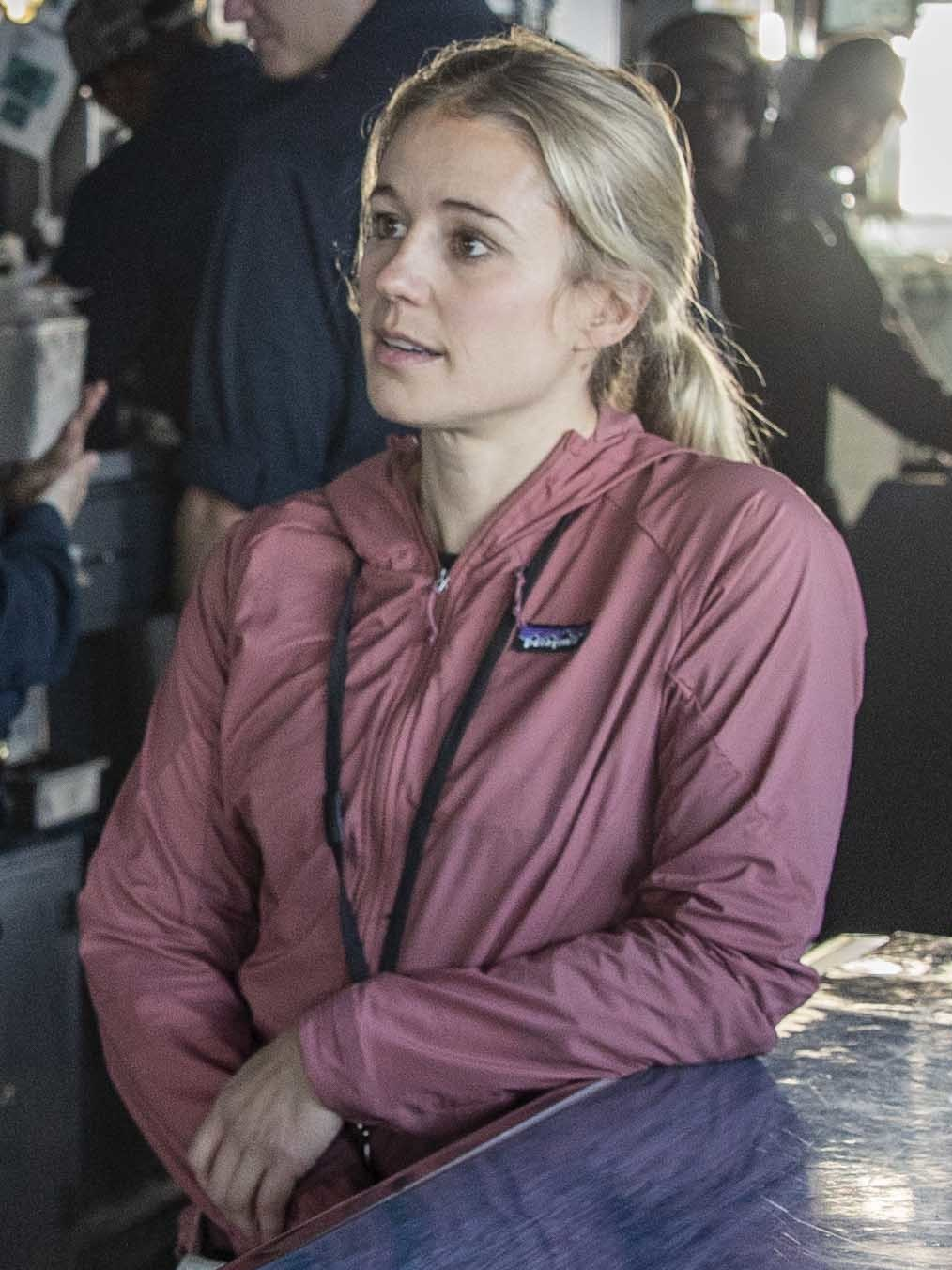
- Gleich in 2022

Personal details
- Born: December 31, 1985 (age 40) Rochester, Minnesota, U.S.
- Party: Democratic
- Spouse: Robert Lea (m. 2019)
- Parent(s): Kristin M. Leiferman and Gerald J. Gleich
- Education: University of Utah (BS)

Caroline Louise Gleich (born December 31, 1985) is an American environmentalist, skier, and mountaineer. An advocate for environmental justice and climate reform, she was the Democratic Party's nominee in the 2024 United States Senate election race in Utah. She lost to Republican Representative John Curtis in the general election by over 30 percentage points.

== Early life and education ==
Gleich was born in Rochester, Minnesota, on the last day of 1985. She and her family moved to Salt Lake City at the age of 15, where she developed an interest in skiing. Both of her parents, Kristin M. Leiferman and Gerald J. Gleich, are physicians at the University of Utah. Gleich decided to become an activist during her senior year in college after enrolling in a course on American national government. She graduated cum laude with a bachelor's degree in anthropology in 2010.

== Career ==
Gleich advocates for environmental justice and climate reform. Some of her work was cited by Protect Our Winters. She is a supporter of the American Public Lands and Waters Climate Solution Act of 2019, and testified in front of Congress in support of the bill.

On January 8, 2024, Gleich announced her candidacy for the 2024 United States Senate election in Utah. She had filed a request seeking an exemption from some campaign finance rules surrounding sponsored social media posts that she alleges make it difficult for content creators to run for office when they have sponsors. This is because current Federal Election Commission rules prevent sponsored posts in Utah within 90 days of the election unless they are listed in campaign finance reports.

On November 5, 2025, she won a seat on the Summit County Service Area #3 Lower Board of Trustees while running as a nonpartisan candidate.

== Personal life ==
Gleich and her husband, Robert J. Lea, live in Park City, Utah. They were married at the Snowbird Resort on August 10, 2019.

In addition to her activism, Gleich is a professional skier and mountaineer. In 2017, she became the first woman and fourth skier to ski all 90 lines of the Chuting Gallery, a series of skiing slopes in the Wasatch Mountains. She summited Mount Everest with her husband in 2019, in an effort to promote gender equality in sports.

Party political offices
Preceded by Jenny Wilson	Democratic nominee for U.S. Senator from Utah (Class 1); 2024	Most recent
