= 2018 United States House of Representatives elections in Utah =

- November 6, 2018

All 4 Utah seats to the United States House of Representatives
| | Majority party | Minority party |
|---|---|---|
| Party | Republican | Democratic |
| Last election | 4 | 0 |
| Seats won | 3 | 1 |
| Seat change | ▼1 | ▲1 |
| Popular vote | 617,307 | 374,009 |
| Percentage | 58.65% | 35.54% |
| Swing | ▼5.13% | ▲3.56% |

Republican
50–60%
60–70%
70–80%
80–90%
Democratic
50–60%

The 2018 United States House of Representatives elections in Utah were held on November 6, 2018, to elect the four U.S. representatives from the state of Utah, one from each of the state's four congressional districts. The elections coincided with other states' elections to the House of Representatives, elections to the United States Senate and various state and local elections. Registered political parties in Utah must have at least one of their candidates for House of Representatives get 2% of the vote in their respective election in order to maintain their ballot access in future elections.

The Democratic Party gained the 4th Congressional district, thus breaking unitary control of all of Utah's Congressional (House and Senate) seats held by the Republicans, changing the House delegation from Utah from 4–0 Republican to 3–1 Republican. This was the last time that a Democrat won any congressional election in Utah until 2026.

== Overview ==
Popular vote
| Republican | 58.65% |
| Democratic | 35.54% |
| Other | 5.81% |

House seats
| Republican | 75.00% |
| Democratic | 25.00% |

Results of the 2018 United States House of Representatives elections in Utah by district:

| District | Republican | | Democratic | | Others | | Total | | Result |
| District | Votes | % | Votes | % | Votes | % | Votes | % | Result |
|---|---|---|---|---|---|---|---|---|---|
| District 1 | 156,692 | 61.61% | 63,308 | 24.89% | 34,333 | 13.50% | 254,333 | 100% | Republican hold |
| District 2 | 151,489 | 56.10% | 105,051 | 38.90% | 13,504 | 5.00% | 270,044 | 100% | Republican hold |
| District 3 | 174,856 | 67.55% | 70,686 | 27.31% | 13,316 | 5.14% | 258,858 | 100% | Republican hold |
| District 4 | 134,270 | 49.86% | 134,964 | 50.12% | 37 | 0.01% | 269,271 | 100% | Democratic gain |
| Total | 617,307 | 58.65% | 374,009 | 35.54% | 61,190 | 5.81% | 1,052,506 | 100% | |

== District 1 ==
2018 Utah's 1st congressional district election
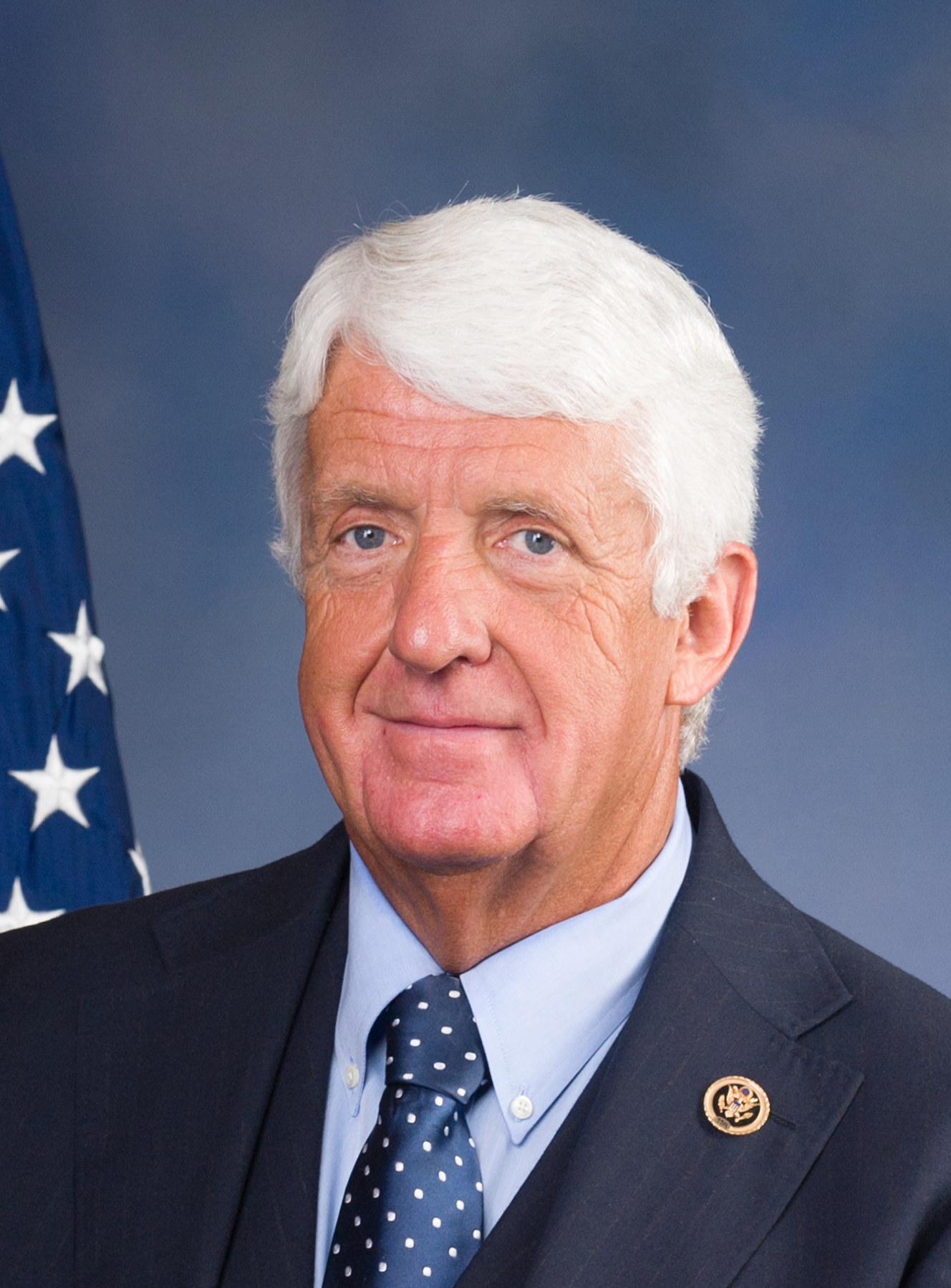

| Nominee | Rob Bishop | Lee Castillo | Eric Eliason |
| Party | Republican | Democratic | United Utah |
| Popular vote | 156,692 | 63,308 | 29,547 |
| Percentage | 61.6% | 24.9% | 11.6% |
- County results Bishop: 50–60% 60–70% 70–80% 80–90% Castillo: 50–60%
U.S. Representative before election
Rob Bishop
Republican
Elected U.S. Representative
Rob Bishop
Republican

The 1st District covers northern Utah, including the cities of Ogden and Logan. Republican Rob Bishop, who had represented the district since 2003, was re-elected to an eighth term with 66% of the vote in 2016.

The 1st District went for Donald Trump in the 2016 presidential election, with 49.7%, with Hillary Clinton and Evan McMullin receiving 22.4% and 22.3% respectively. In 2012 the district went for Mitt Romney over Barack Obama, 77.4% to 20.4%.

=== Republican primary ===
==== Candidates ====
===== Declared =====
- Rob Bishop, incumbent U.S. representative

===== Eliminated at convention =====
- Chadwick Fairbanks, independent candidate for Utah's 1st congressional district in 2016
- Kevin Probasco, attorney and author

=== Democratic primary ===
==== Candidates ====
===== Declared =====
- Lee Castillo, social worker, former board member of the Stonewall Utah Democrats
- Kurt Weiland, president and CEO of Jefferson Smith training and Consulting since 1996

==== Debate ====
2018 Utah's 1st congressional district Democratic primary debate
| No. | Date | Host | Moderator | Link | Democratic | Democratic |
| Key: P Participant A Absent N Not invited I Invited W Withdrawn | | | | | | |
| Key: P Participant A Absent N Not invited I Invited W Withdrawn | | | | | John Curtis | Chris Herrod |
|---|---|---|---|---|---|---|
| 1 | May 29, 2018 | Utah Debate Commission | Kerry Bringhurst | | P | P |

==== Results ====
Democratic primary results
| Party | Candidate | Votes | % |
|---|---|---|---|
| Democratic | Lee Castillo | 7,273 | 57.21 |
| Democratic | Kurt Weiland | 5,439 | 42.79 |
| Total votes | | 12,712 | 100.0 |

=== United Utah Party ===
==== Candidates ====
===== Declared =====
- Eric Eliason, businessman, attorney, and adjunct professor

=== Green Party ===
==== Candidates ====
===== Declared =====
- Adam Davis

=== General election ===
==== Predictions ====
| Source | Ranking | As of |
|---|---|---|
| The Cook Political Report | Safe R | November 5, 2018 |
| Inside Elections | Safe R | November 5, 2018 |
| Sabato's Crystal Ball | Safe R | November 5, 2018 |
| RCP | Safe R | November 5, 2018 |
| Daily Kos | Safe R | November 5, 2018 |
| 538 | Safe R | November 7, 2018 |
| CNN | Safe R | October 31, 2018 |
| Politico | Safe R | November 4, 2018 |

==== Debate ====
2028 Utah's 1st congressional district debate
| No. | Date | Host | Moderator | Link | Republican | Democratic | United Utah |
| Key: P Participant A Absent N Not invited I Invited W Withdrawn | | | | | | | |
| Key: P Participant A Absent N Not invited I Invited W Withdrawn | | | | | Rob Bishop | Lee Castillo | Eric Eliason |
|---|---|---|---|---|---|---|---|
| 1 | Oct. 17, 2018 | Utah Debate Commission | Natalie Gochnour | | P | P | P |

==== Polling ====
| Poll source | Date(s) administered | Sample size | Margin of error | Rob Bishop (R) | Lee Castillo (D) | Eric Eliason (UU) | Adam Davis (G) | Undecided |
|---|---|---|---|---|---|---|---|---|
| University of Utah | October 3–9, 2018 | 143 | ± 8.0% | 52% | 20% | 10% | 2% | 16% |
| Dan Jones & Associates | August 22 – September 6, 2018 | 201 | ± 6.9% | 59% | 22% | 8% | 3% | 8% |
| Lighthouse Research | August 11–27, 2018 | 600 | – | 51% | 16% | 7% | 2% | 24% |

==== Results ====
Utah's 1st congressional district, 2018
| Party | Candidate | Votes | % |
|---|---|---|---|
| Republican | Rob Bishop (incumbent) | 156,692 | 61.6 |
| Democratic | Lee Castillo | 63,308 | 24.9 |
| United Utah | Eric Eliason | 29,547 | 11.6 |
| Green | Adam Davis | 4,786 | 1.9 |
| Total votes | | 254,333 | 100.0 |
| Republican hold | | | |

== District 2 ==
2018 Utah's 2nd congressional district election
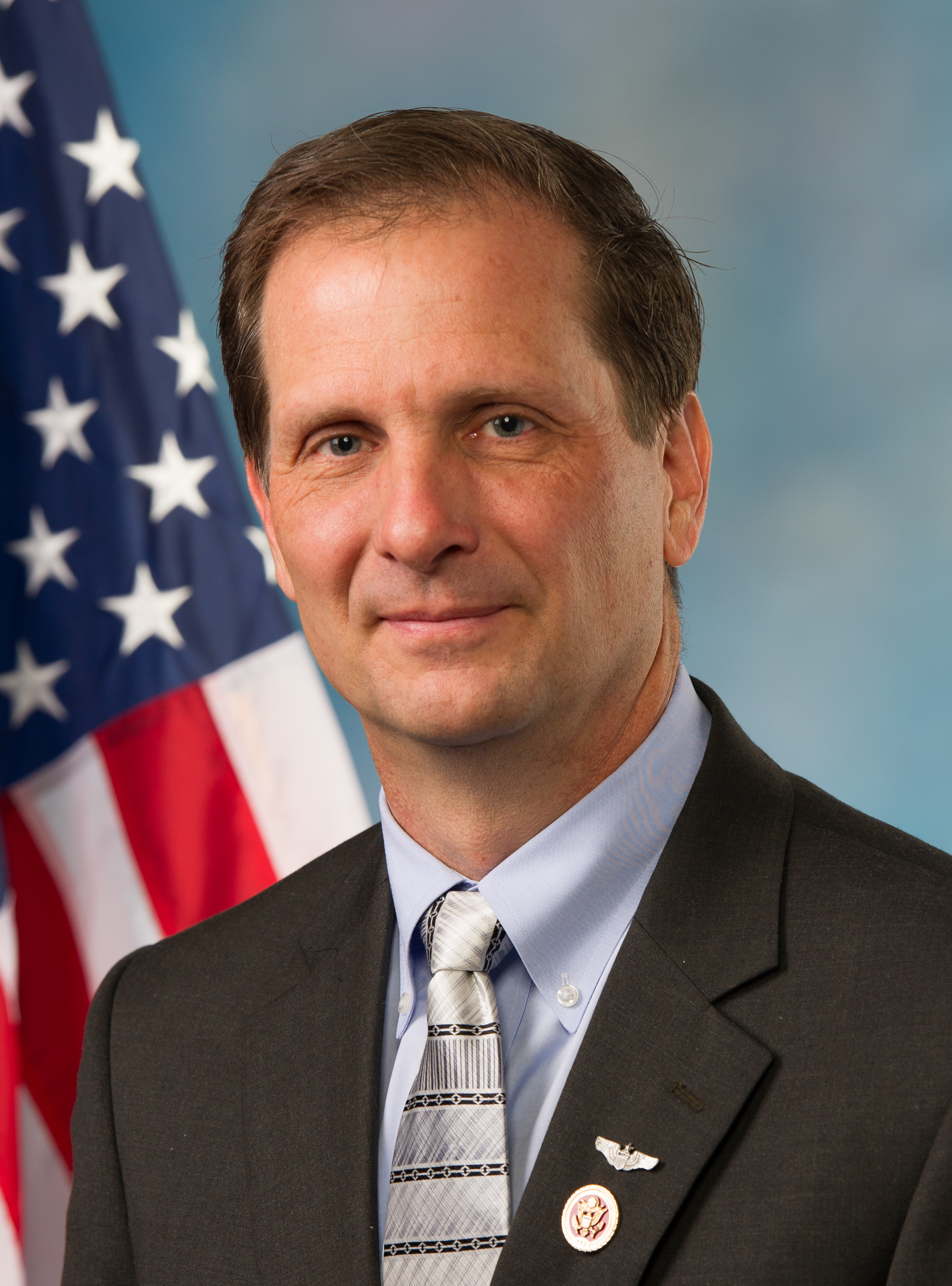

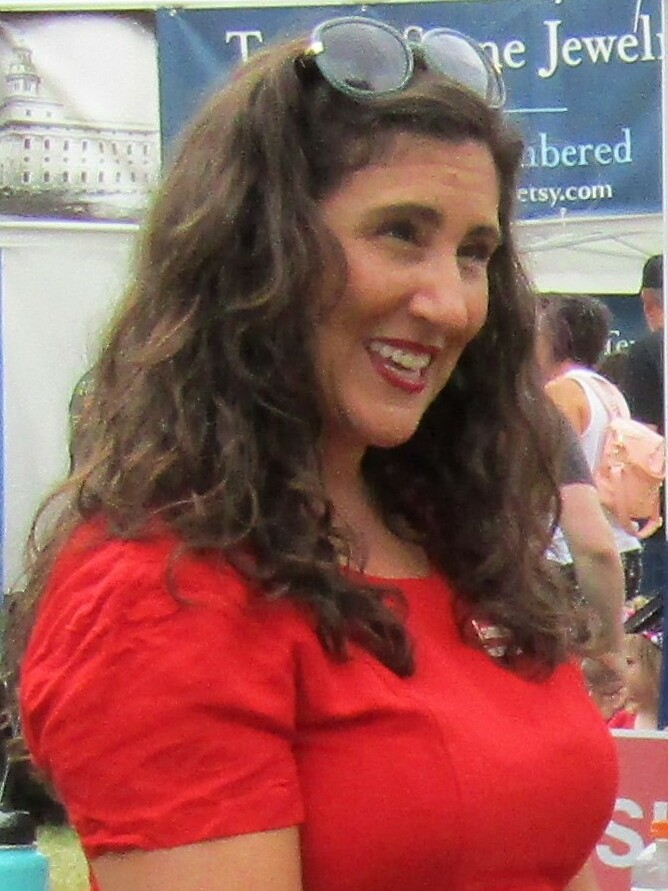

| Nominee | Chris Stewart | Shireen Ghorbani | Jeffrey Whipple |
| Party | Republican | Democratic | Libertarian |
| Popular vote | 151,489 | 105,051 | 13,504 |
| Percentage | 56.1% | 38.9% | 5.0% |
- County results Stewart: 60–70% 70–80% 80–90% Ghorbani: 60–70%
U.S. Representative before election
Chris Stewart
Republican
Elected U.S. Representative
Chris Stewart
Republican

The 2nd District stretches from the Summit County, Utah line and goes west to the Nevada border and down through St. George. It includes parts of Davis, Salt Lake, Sanpete, and Juab Counties. Republican Chris Stewart, who had represented the district since 2013, was re-elected to a third term with 62% of the vote in 2016

The 2nd District went for Donald Trump in the 2016 presidential election, with 46%, with Hillary Clinton and Evan McMullin receiving 32% and 16.9% respectively. In 2012 the district went for Mitt Romney over Barack Obama, 68% to 29.2%.

=== Republican primary ===
==== Candidates ====
===== Declared =====
- Chris Stewart, incumbent U.S. representative

===== Eliminated at convention =====
- Mary Burkett, a businesswoman and former vice chair of the Washington County Republican Party, formed an exploratory committee for a potential primary challenge of Stewart.
- Ken Clark

=== Democratic primary ===
==== Candidates ====
===== Declared =====
- Shireen Ghorbani, communications professional

===== Eliminated at convention =====
- Randy Hopkins, retired Utah Department of Workforce Services regional director

===== Withdrew =====
- Misty K. Snow, nominee for U.S. Senate in 2016

=== United Utah Party ===
==== Candidates ====
===== Declared =====
- Jan Garbett

=== Libertarian Party ===
==== Candidates ====
===== Declared =====
- Jeffrey Whipple

=== General election ===
==== Predictions ====
| Source | Ranking | As of |
|---|---|---|
| The Cook Political Report | Safe R | November 5, 2018 |
| Inside Elections | Safe R | November 5, 2018 |
| Sabato's Crystal Ball | Safe R | November 5, 2018 |
| RCP | Safe R | November 5, 2018 |
| Daily Kos | Safe R | November 5, 2018 |
| 538 | Safe R | November 7, 2018 |
| CNN | Safe R | October 31, 2018 |
| Politico | Safe R | November 4, 2018 |

==== Debate ====
2018 Utah's 2nd congressional district debate
| No. | Date | Host | Moderator | Link | Republican | Democratic |
| Key: P Participant A Absent N Not invited I Invited W Withdrawn | | | | | | |
| Key: P Participant A Absent N Not invited I Invited W Withdrawn | | | | | Chris Stewart | Shireen Ghorbani |
|---|---|---|---|---|---|---|
| 1 | Sep. 19, 2018 | Utah Debate Commission | Doug Wilks | | P | P |

==== Polling ====
| Poll source | Date(s) administered | Sample size | Margin of error | Chris Stewart (R) | Shireen Ghorbani (D) | Jeffrey Whipple (L) | Other | Undecided |
|---|---|---|---|---|---|---|---|---|
| University of Utah | October 3–17, 2018 | 401 | ± 4.9% | 52% | 29% | 6% | – | 12% |
| Dan Jones & Associates | August 22 – September 6, 2018 | 202 | ± 6.9% | 45% | 34% | 5% | – | 16% |
| Lighthouse Research | August 11–27, 2018 | 600 | – | 49% | 27% | 5% | – | 19% |
| University of Utah | June 11–18, 2018 | 147 | ± 7.7% | 48% | 24% | – | 14% | 13% |

==== Results ====
Utah's 2nd congressional district, 2018
| Party | Candidate | Votes | % |
|---|---|---|---|
| Republican | Chris Stewart (incumbent) | 151,489 | 56.1 |
| Democratic | Shireen Ghorbani | 105,051 | 38.9 |
| Libertarian | Jeffrey Whipple | 13,504 | 5.0 |
| Total votes | | 270,044 | 100.0 |
| Republican hold | | | |

== District 3 ==
2018 Utah's 3rd congressional district election
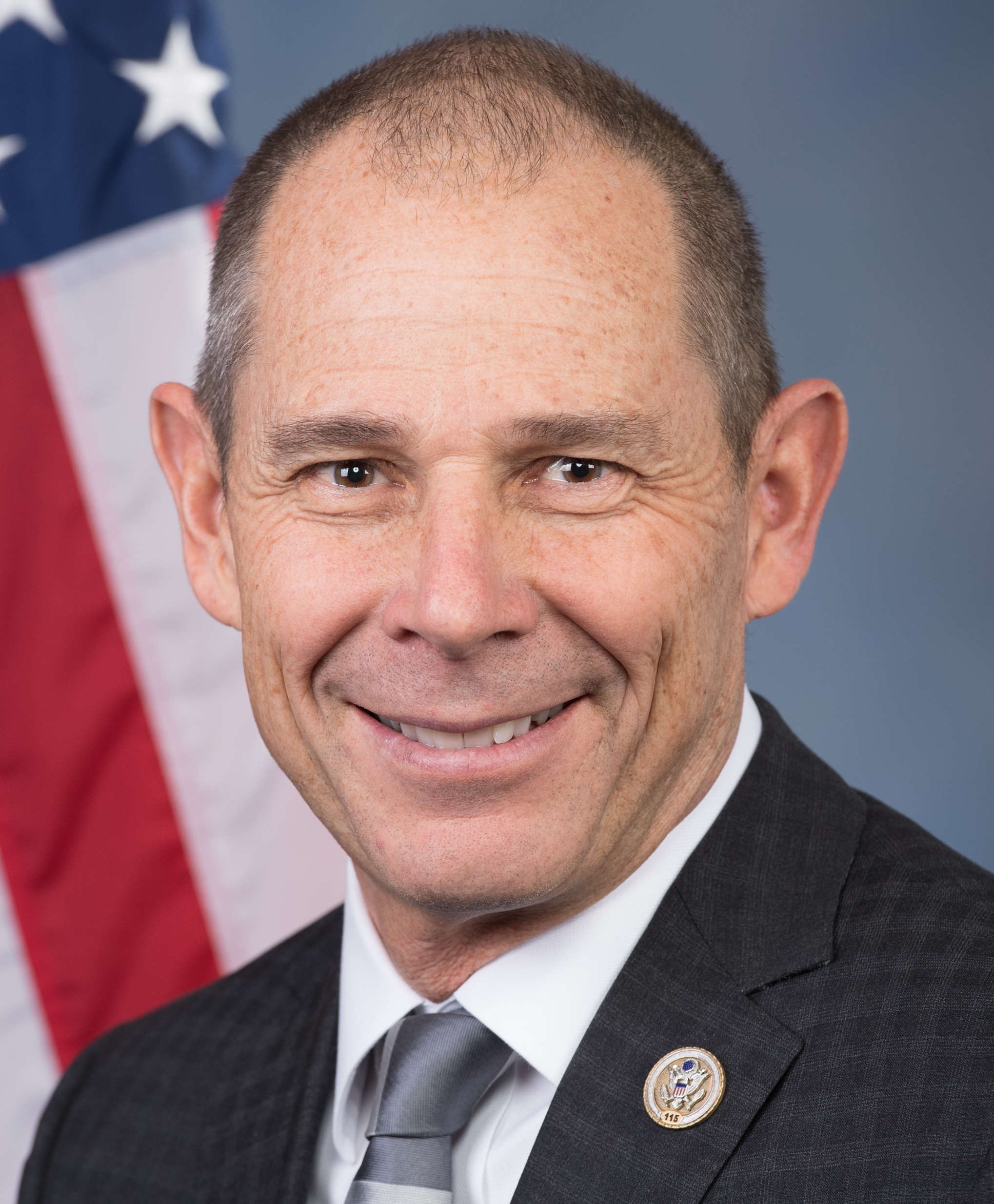

| Nominee | John Curtis | James Singer |
| Party | Republican | Democratic |
| Popular vote | 174,856 | 70,686 |
| Percentage | 67.5% | 27.3% |
- County results Curtis: 50–60% 60–70% 70–80% 80–90% Singer: 50–60%
U.S. Representative before election
John Curtis
Republican
Elected U.S. Representative
John Curtis
Republican

The 3rd district is located in southern and eastern Utah and includes the cities of Orem and Provo. Republican John Curtis, who had represented the district since 2017, was elected to his first term in a 2017 special election with 57.6% of the vote.

The 3rd District went for Donald Trump in the 2016 presidential election, with 47.2%, with Evan McMullin and Hillary Clinton receiving 24.5% and 23.3% respectively. In 2012 the district went for Mitt Romney over Barack Obama, 78.3% to 19.5%.

=== Republican primary ===
==== Candidates ====
===== Declared =====
- John Curtis, incumbent U.S. representative
- Chris Herrod, former state representative and candidate for Utah's 3rd congressional district in the 2017 special election

===== Eliminated at convention =====
- Damian Kidd, attorney

===== Declined =====
- Curt Bramble, state senator
- Jason Chaffetz, former U.S. representative
- Deidre Henderson, state senator
- Mike McKell, state representative
- Evan McMullin, retired CIA officer and independent candidate for U.S. President in 2016

==== Polling ====
| Poll source | Date(s) administered | Sample size | Margin of error | John Curtis | Chris Herrod | Other | Undecided |
|---|---|---|---|---|---|---|---|
| University of Utah | June 11–18, 2018 | 183 | ± 7.2% | 57% | 21% | – | 21% |

==== Debate ====
2018 Utah's 3rd congressional district republican primary debate
| No. | Date | Host | Moderator | Link | Republican | Republican |
| Key: P Participant A Absent N Not invited I Invited W Withdrawn | | | | | | |
| Key: P Participant A Absent N Not invited I Invited W Withdrawn | | | | | John Curtis | Chris Herrod |
|---|---|---|---|---|---|---|
| 1 | May 29, 2018 | Utah Debate Commission | Jennifer Napier-Pearce | | P | P |

==== Results ====
Republican primary results
| Party | Candidate | Votes | % |
|---|---|---|---|
| Republican | John Curtis (incumbent) | 66,404 | 73.32 |
| Republican | Chris Herrod | 24,158 | 26.68 |
| Total votes | | 90,562 | 100.0 |

=== Democratic primary ===
==== Candidates ====
===== Declared =====
- James Singer, college professor

===== Eliminated at convention =====
- Kent Moon

===== Withdrew =====
- Kathryn Allen, physician
- Ben Frank

=== General election ===
==== Predictions ====
| Source | Ranking | As of |
|---|---|---|
| The Cook Political Report | Safe R | November 5, 2018 |
| Inside Elections | Safe R | November 5, 2018 |
| Sabato's Crystal Ball | Safe R | November 5, 2018 |
| RCP | Safe R | November 5, 2018 |
| Daily Kos | Safe R | November 5, 2018 |
| 538 | Safe R | November 7, 2018 |
| CNN | Safe R | October 31, 2018 |
| Politico | Safe R | November 4, 2018 |

==== Debate ====
2018 Utah's 3rd congressional district debate
| No. | Date | Host | Moderator | Link | Republican | Democratic |
| Key: P Participant A Absent N Not invited I Invited W Withdrawn | | | | | | |
| Key: P Participant A Absent N Not invited I Invited W Withdrawn | | | | | John Curtis | James Singer |
|---|---|---|---|---|---|---|
| 1 | Oct. 26, 2018 | Utah Debate Commission | David Magleby | | P | P |

==== Polling ====
| Poll source | Date(s) administered | Sample size | Margin of error | John Curtis (R) | James Singer (D) | Timothy Zeidner (UU) | Gregory Duerden (IA) | Undecided |
|---|---|---|---|---|---|---|---|---|
| University of Utah | October 3–9, 2018 | 143 | ± 8.0% | 67% | 13% | 4% | 1% | 15% |
| Dan Jones & Associates | August 22 – September 6, 2018 | 188 | ± 7.2% | 65% | 19% | 2% | 4% | 11% |
| Lighthouse Research | August 11–27, 2018 | 600 | – | 52% | 20% | 2% | 4% | 22% |

==== Results ====
Utah's 3rd congressional district, 2018
| Party | Candidate | Votes | % |
|---|---|---|---|
| Republican | John Curtis (incumbent) | 174,856 | 67.5 |
| Democratic | James Singer | 70,686 | 27.3 |
| Independent American | Gregory Duerden | 6,686 | 2.6 |
| United Utah | Timothy Zeidner | 6,630 | 2.6 |
| Total votes | | 258,858 | 100.0 |
| Republican hold | | | |

== District 4 ==
2018 Utah's 4th congressional district election
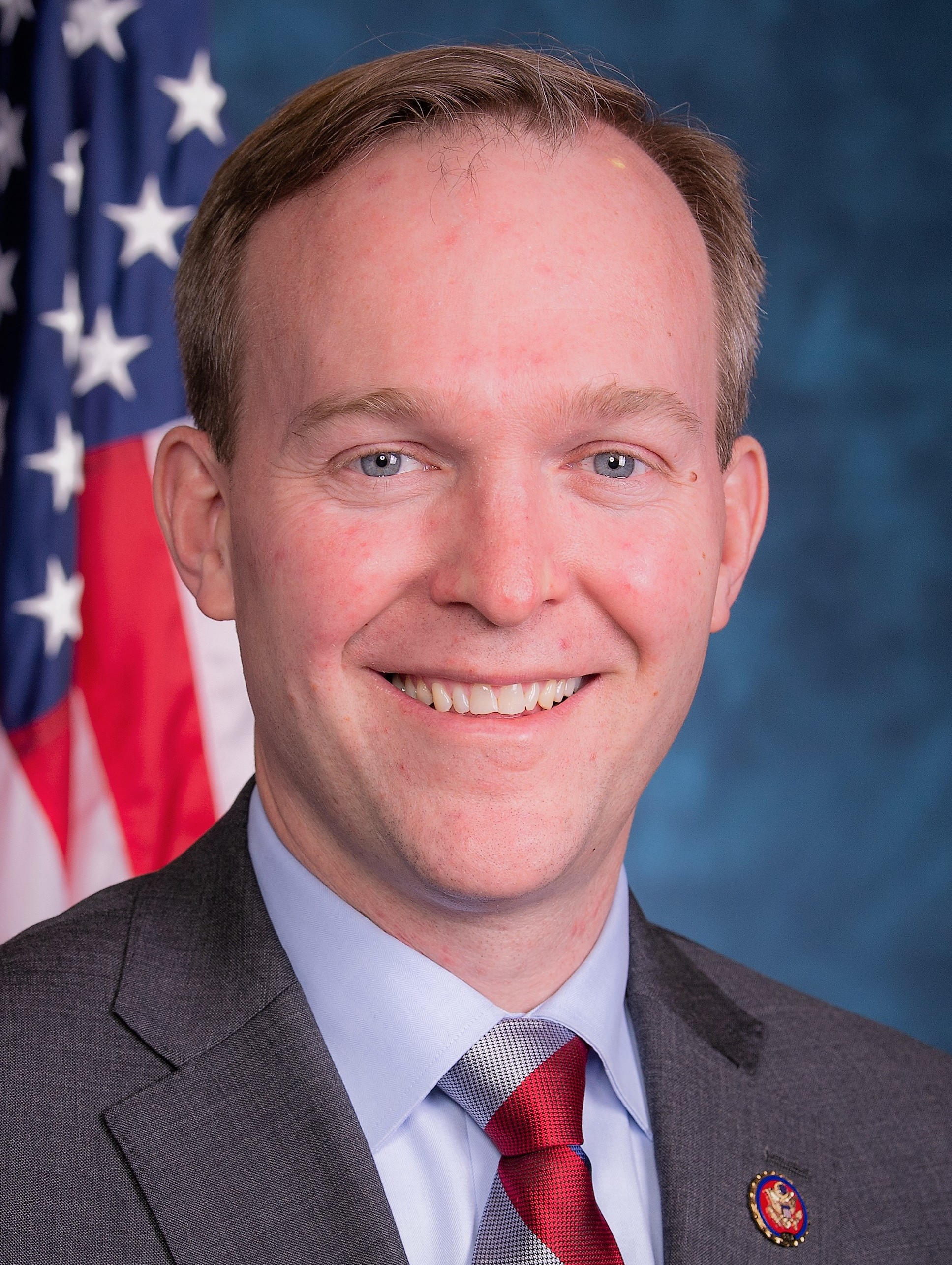

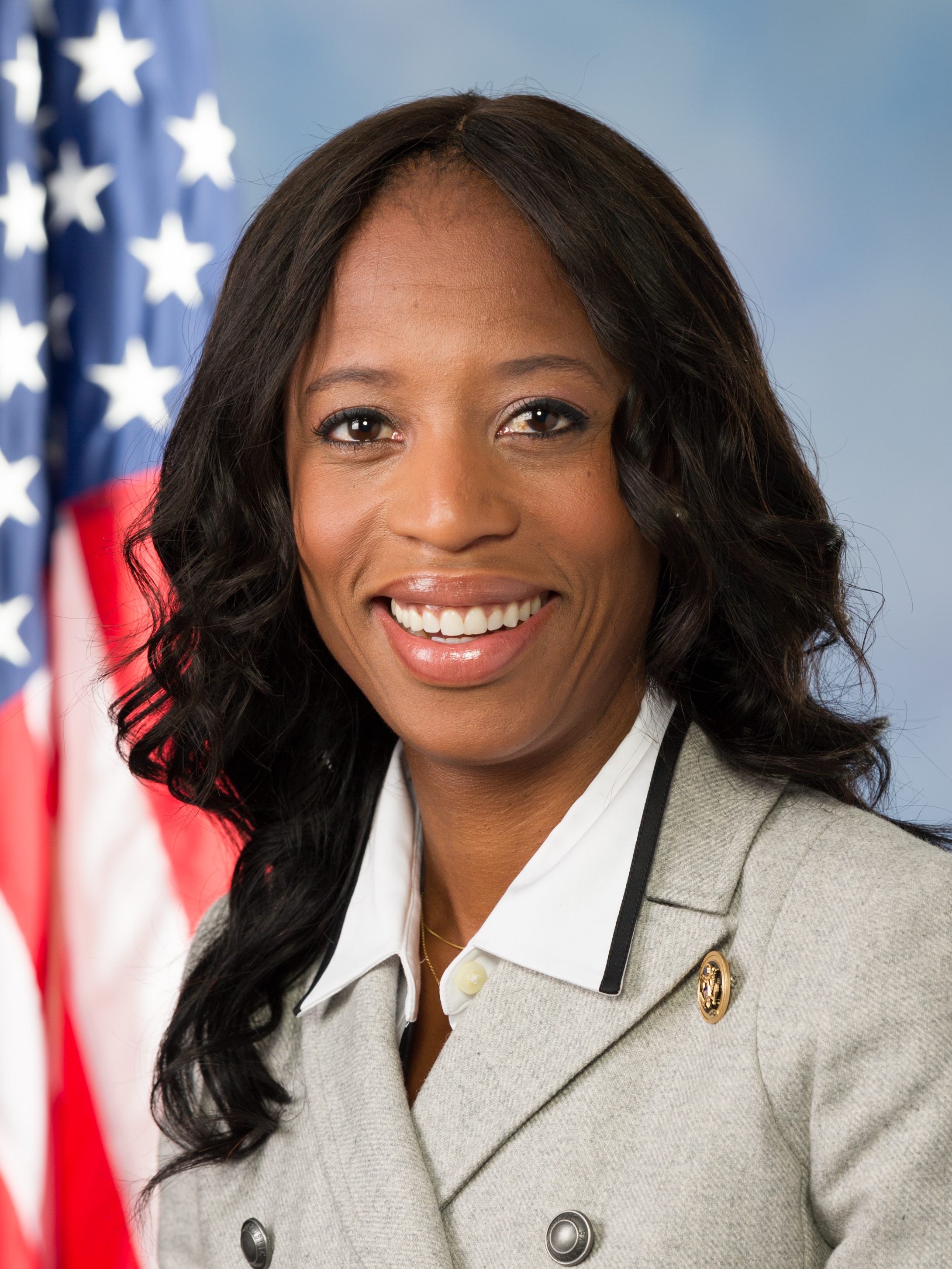
| Nominee | Ben McAdams | Mia Love |
| Party | Democratic | Republican |
| Popular vote | 134,964 | 134,270 |
| Percentage | 50.1% | 49.9% |
- County results McAdams: 50–60% Love: 70–80%
U.S. Representative before election
Mia Love
Republican
Elected U.S. Representative
Ben McAdams
Democratic

The 4th district is located in northern-central Utah and includes parts of Salt Lake, Utah, Juab, and Sanpete Counties. Republican Mia Love, who had represented the district since 2015, was re-elected to a second term with 54% of the vote in 2016.

Salt Lake County Mayor Ben McAdams was selected in the Democratic primary.

The 4th District voted for Donald Trump in the 2016 presidential election, with 39.1%, with Hillary Clinton and Evan McMullin receiving 32.4% and 22.5% respectively. In 2012, the district voted for Mitt Romney over Barack Obama, 67.2% to 30.2%.

McAdams would end up defeating Love by 694 votes.

=== Republican primary ===
==== Candidates ====
===== Declared =====
- Mia Love, incumbent U.S. representative

=== Democratic primary ===
==== Candidates ====
===== Declared =====
- Ben McAdams, mayor of Salt Lake County

===== Eliminated at convention =====
- Sheldon Kirkham
- Darlene McDonald, author and activist
- Morgan Shepherd
- Tom Taylor, engineer and scientist

=== General election ===
==== Predictions ====
| Source | Ranking | As of |
|---|---|---|
| The Cook Political Report | Tossup | November 5, 2018 |
| Inside Elections | Tossup | November 5, 2018 |
| Sabato's Crystal Ball | Lean D (flip) | November 5, 2018 |
| RCP | Tossup | November 5, 2018 |
| Daily Kos | Tossup | November 5, 2018 |
| 538 | Lean D (flip) | November 7, 2018 |

==== Debate ====
2018 Utah's 1st congressional district debate
| No. | Date | Host | Moderator | Link | Republican | Democratic |
| Key: P Participant A Absent N Not invited I Invited W Withdrawn | | | | | | |
| Key: P Participant A Absent N Not invited I Invited W Withdrawn | | | | | Mia Love | Ben McAdams |
|---|---|---|---|---|---|---|
| 1 | Oct. 15, 2018 | Utah Debate Commission | Doug Wright | | P | P |

==== Polling ====
View source data.

| Poll source | Date(s) administered | Sample size | Margin of error | Mia Love (R) | Ben McAdams (D) | Other | Undecided |
|---|---|---|---|---|---|---|---|
| NYT Upshot/Siena College | October 24–26, 2018 | 526 | ± 4.7% | 45% | 45% | – | 9% |
| Dixie Strategies | October 25, 2018 | 936 | ± 3.2% | 43% | 50% | – | 7% |
| University of Utah | October 3–11, 2018 | 403 | ± 4.9% | 46% | 46% | – | 8% |
| Mellman Group (D-McAdams) | October 7–10, 2018 | 400 | ± 4.9% | 46% | 47% | – | – |
| Y2 Analytics (R-Love) | September 6–8, 2018 | 405 | ± 4.86% | 51% | 42% | – | 7% |
| Dan Jones & Associates | August 22 – September 6, 2018 | 400 | ± 4.9% | 49% | 46% | – | 5% |
| Mellman Group (D-McAdams) | August 20–23, 2018 | 400 | ± 4.9% | 46% | 44% | – | – |
| Lighthouse Research | August 11–27, 2018 | 600 | – | 47% | 38% | – | 15% |
| University of Utah | June 11–18, 2018 | 379 | ± 5.0% | 45% | 39% | 8% | 8% |
| Dan Jones & Associates | May 15–June 5, 2018 | 405 | ± 5.0% | 47% | 43% | – | 10% |
| Mellman Group (D-McAdams) | February 27 – March 4, 2018 | 400 | ± 4.9% | 43% | 40% | – | – |
| Dan Jones & Associates | February 9–21, 2018 | 404 | ± 4.9% | 49% | 43% | – | 8% |
| Dan Jones & Associates | January 15–22, 2018 | 400 | ± 4.9% | 47% | 42% | – | 11% |
| Dan Jones & Associates | October 9–18, 2017 | 402 | ± 4.89% | 48% | 42% | – | 9% |

==== Results ====
Utah's 4th congressional district, 2018
| Party | Candidate | Votes | % |
|---|---|---|---|
| Democratic | Ben McAdams | 134,964 | 50.1 |
| Republican | Mia Love (incumbent) | 134,270 | 49.9 |
| Independent | Jonathan Larele Peterson (write-in) | 37 | 0.0 |
| Total votes | | 269,271 | 100.0 |
| Democratic gain from Republican | | | |
