= 2017 Utah's 3rd congressional district special election =

- November 7, 2017

Utah's 3rd congressional district
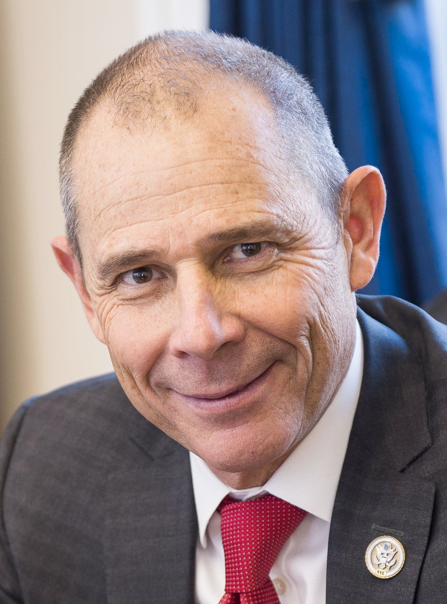

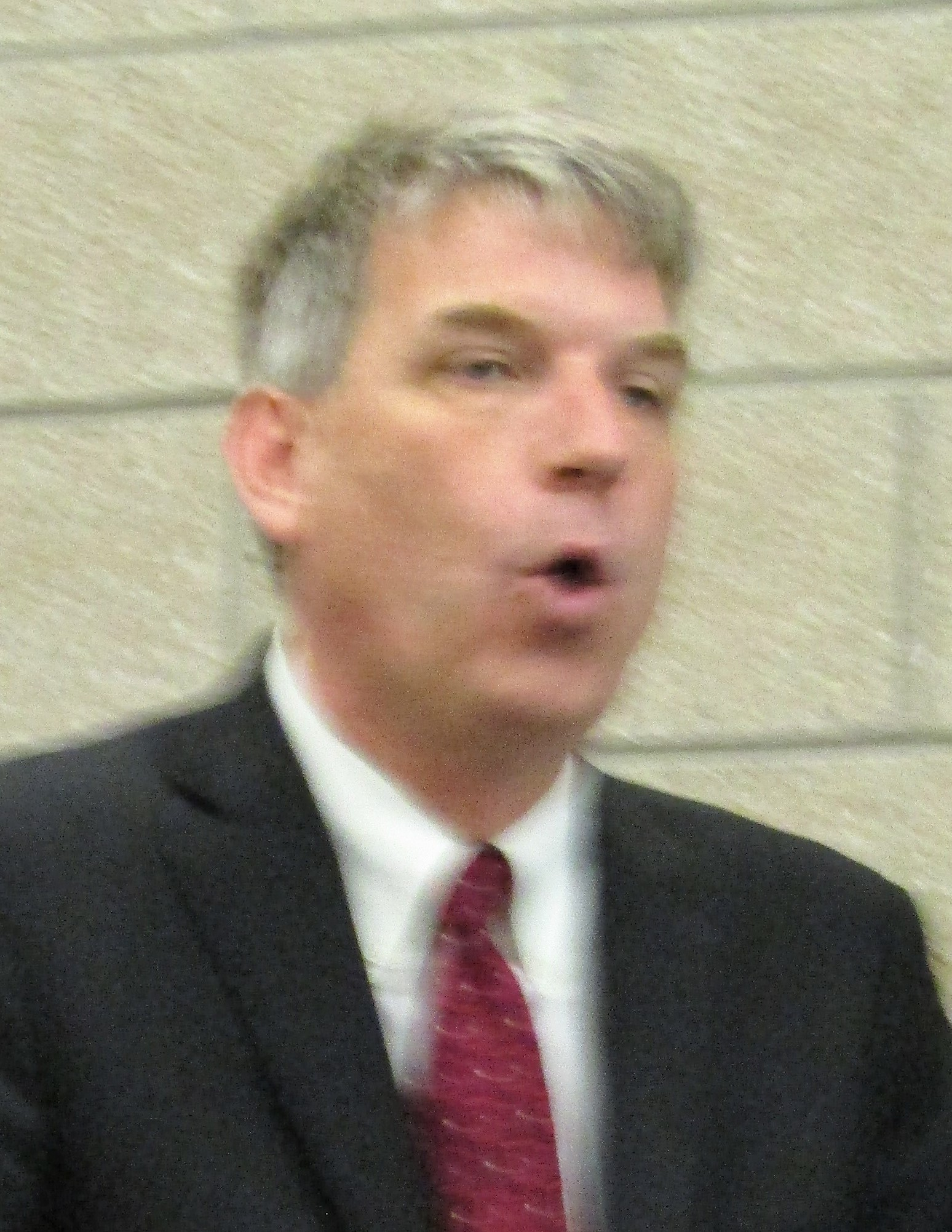
Nominee	John Curtis	Kathie Allen	Jim Bennett
Party	Republican	Democratic	United Utah
Popular vote	85,751	37,801	13,747
Percentage	58.0%	25.6%	9.3%
- County results Curtis: 40–50% 50–60% 60–70% Allen: 50–60%
U.S. Representative before election
Jason Chaffetz
Republican
Elected U.S. Representative
John Curtis
Republican

After previously stating that he would not run for re-election, Jason Chaffetz announced on May 19 that he was resigning his seat in the House, effective June 30. A special election was called to replace him with a filing period opening on May 19 and closing by June 30, an expected primary date of August 15, and an election day of November 7.

A crowded field of candidates emerged to compete for spots in their respective parties' primaries. 15 Republicans, 4 Democrats, 2 Independent American Party members and 1 Libertarian declared their candidacy. Candidates could qualify for the primary ballot by either being nominated by delegates at their party's convention or gathering 7,000 signatures from registered voters. Those gathering signatures could also seek nomination at their party's convention. The Republican and Democratic parties held conventions June 17 to select a nominee from the declared.

The primary election to determine the Republican Party's candidate for the general election was held on August 15. In addition to the partisan candidates, one unaffiliated candidate appeared on the general election ballot and two candidates ran as a write-in.

The general election was held on Tuesday, November 7, 2017. Republican John Curtis was declared the winner and was subsequently seated by the U.S. House for a term that ends January 3, 2019.

== Republican primary ==
The Republican primary was held on Tuesday August 15, 2017. Only registered Republicans living in the 3rd congressional district were able vote in the primary, though unaffiliated voters were allowed to affiliate as Republicans at polling locations on election day.

=== Candidates ===
Fifteen candidates declared their candidacy for the Republican party nomination. While four candidates declared their intent to gather signatures, only two submitted signatures for verification by the required deadline. This election was the first time in Utah politics where three candidates were on the primary ballot since two candidates submitted enough signatures to qualify for the primary ballot and the party nominated a third candidate at its convention.

==== Nominated ====
- John Curtis, Mayor of Provo

==== Eliminated in primary ====
- Tanner Ainge, son of Danny Ainge
- Chris Herrod, real estate developer, former state representative and candidate for the U.S. Senate in 2012

Ainge and Curtis submitted enough signatures to qualify for spots on the primary ballot. Curtis also participated in the convention process, but lost to Herrod who was nominated at the convention. Curtis would go on to win the primary.

==== Lost at convention ====
- Debbie Aldrich
- Brad Daw, state representative
- Margaret Dayton, state senator
- Paul David Fife
- Deidre Henderson, state senator
- Damian Kidd, attorney
- Keith Kuder
- Stewart Peay, attorney
- Shayne Horton Row

==== Withdrawn before convention ====
- Jeremy Lewis Friedbaum
- Mike Leavitt, not to be confused with former Utah Governor Mike Leavitt

==== Failed to qualify for primary via signature gathering process ====
- Brigham Rhead Cottam

=== Convention results ===
Republican Convention
Candidate	First ballot	Pct.	Second ballot	Pct.	Third ballot	Pct.	Fourth ballot	Pct.	Fifth ballot	Pct.
Christopher Herrod	200	25.64%	238	31.23%	264	34.87%	337	44.81%	415	55.11%
Deidre Henderson	202	25.90%	225	29.53%	271	35.80%	301	40.03%	338	44.89%
Margaret Dayton	145	18.59%	140	18.37%	113	14.93%	68	9.04%	Eliminated	
Stewart Peay	74	9.49%	47	6.17%	45	5.94%	27	3.59%	Eliminated	
John Curtis	71	9.10%	52	6.82%	35	4.62%	19	2.53%	Eliminated	
Damian Kidd	48	6.15%	39	5.12%	29	3.83%	Eliminated			
Brad Daw	19	2.44%	12	1.57%	Eliminated					
Paul Fife	15	1.92%	9	1.18%	Eliminated					
Debbie Aldrich	4	0.51%	Eliminated							
Shayne Row	2	0.26%	Eliminated							
Keith Kuder	0	0.00%	Eliminated							

=== Endorsements ===
Tanner Ainge

Utah State Senators

- Jake Anderegg, Lehi
- Dan Hemmert, Orem

Utah State Representatives

- Marc Roberts, Salem
- Norm Thurston, Provo
- Tim Quinn, Heber

Other Endorsements

- Sarah Palin, former governor of Alaska
Chris Herrod

U.S. Senators

- Ted Cruz, Texas
- Rand Paul, Kentucky

Organizations

- Freedom Works
- Senate Conservatives Fund
- Club for Growth

Individuals

- Glenn Beck

=== Polling ===
Poll source	Date(s) administered	Sample size	Margin of error	John Curtis (R)	Chris Herrod (R)	Tanner Ainge (R)	Undecided
Dan Jones & Associates	June 23 – July 5, 2017	199	4.9%	27%	9%	7%	57%

=== Primary results ===
Results by county: Curtis: Curtis—30–40%; Curtis—40–50%; Herrod: Herrod—30–40%; Herrod—40–50%; Herrod—60–70%; Ainge: Ainge—30–40%

Utah's 3rd congressional district special election Republican primary (2017)
Party	Candidate	Votes	%
Republican	John Curtis	31,481	43.28%
Republican	Chris Herrod	23,686	32.57%
Republican	Tanner Ainge	17,565	24.15%
Total votes		72,732	100.00%

== Democratic Party ==
Four candidates declared their candidacy for the Democratic party nomination. Two candidates declared their intent to gather signatures but neither submitted signatures for verification prior to the required deadline. On June 17, 2017, the Democratic Party formally nominated Kathie Allen as their candidate, eliminating the need for a primary election.

=== Candidates ===
==== Nominated ====
- Kathie Allen, physician

==== Lost at convention ====
- Carl Ingwell, biologist
- Ben Frank, activist

==== Withdrawn before convention ====
- Faeiza Javed

=== Convention results ===
Democratic Convention
Candidate	First ballot	Pct.
Kathie Allen		76%
Carl Ingwell		
Ben Frank		

== Third-party and independent candidates ==
=== United Utah Party ===
The newly formed United Utah Party submitted the required number of signatures to be recognized as a political party in Utah on May 25, one day before the candidate filing deadline. Jim Bennett, the party's executive director, filed to run as its nominee but was rejected because the state had not yet processed the submitted signatures.

The party took the issue to court, and a federal judge found that Utah had illegally violated Bennett's First and Fourteenth Amendment rights by denying him a spot on the ballot. The state elections office immediately complied with the court order and declined to appeal the decision. Jim Bennett was placed on the general election ballot as the United Utah Party candidate.

==== Nominee ====
- Jim Bennett, executive director of the United Utah Party and son of former U.S. Senator Bob Bennett

=== Independent American Party ===
==== Candidates ====
Two candidates declared their intent to seek the nomination of the Independent American Party.

===== Nominated =====
- Jason Christensen

==== Lost at convention ====
- Aaron Heineman

=== Libertarian Party ===
==== Nominee ====
- Joe Buchman

=== Independents ===
- Sean Whalen

=== Write-in candidates ===
- Brendan Phillips
- Russell Paul Roesler

== General election ==
The special general election was held on Tuesday, November 7, 2017.

=== Candidates ===
Major

The following candidates qualified to appear in the state-sponsored debates:

- John Curtis (Republican), Mayor of Provo
- Kathie Allen (Democratic), physician
- Jim Bennett (United Utah), son of former U.S. Senator Bob Bennett, grandson of former U.S. Senator Wallace F. Bennett. Bennett is the first third-party candidate in history to cross the threshold to appear in the official debate commission debate.

Minor

The following third-party or independent candidates qualified for the ballot but didn't poll high enough to currently qualify for the state-sponsored debates:

- Joe Buchman (Libertarian)
- Jason Christensen (Independent American)
- Sean Whalen (Independent)

=== Debate ===
2017 Utah's 3rd congressional district special election debate
No.	Date	Host	Moderator	Link	Republican	Democratic	United Utah
Key: P Participant A Absent N Not invited I Invited W Withdrawn							
Key: P Participant A Absent N Not invited I Invited W Withdrawn					John Curtis	Kathie Allen	Jim Bennett
1	Oct. 20, 2017	Utah Debate Commission	David Magleby		P	P	P

=== Predictions ===
Source	Ranking	As of
The Cook Political Report	Solid R	July 21, 2017

=== Endorsements ===
John Curtis

U.S. Governors

- Gary Herbert, Governor of Utah
- Mitt Romney, former Governor of Massachusetts and 2012 Republican nominee for President of the United States

Utah Mayors

- Jeff Acerson, Lindon
- Bert Wilson, Lehi
- Gary Gygi, Cedar Hills
- Wilford Clyde, Springville
- Steve Leifson, Spanish Fork
- Tom Dolan, Sandy
- Brian Wall, Mapleton
- J. H. Hadfield, American Fork
- Randy Farnworth, Vineyard
- Mark Thompson, Highland
- Mike Caldwell, Ogden
- Jon Pike, St George
- Mark Jones, Nephi
- Ted Eyre, Murray
- Bill Applegarth, Riverton
- Randy Brailsford, Salem
- Russell Mangelson, Levan
- Korry Soper, Manti
- Lonny Ward, Genola
- Sheldon Wimmer, Alpine
- Richard Brunst, Orem
- Kelvyn Cullimore, Cottonwood Heights

Newspapers

- Daily Herald
- The Salt Lake Tribune
Kathie Allen

Politicians

- Sam Granato, Salt Lake County Councillor (District 4)

=== Polling ===
Poll source	Date(s) administered	Sample size	Margin of error	Kathie Allen (D)	Jim Bennett (UU)	Joe Buchman (L)	Jason Christensen (IA)	John Curtis (R)	Sean Whalen (Ind.)	Write-ins	Other	Undecided
Dan Jones & Associates	October 9–16, 2017	410	± 4.8%	19%	9%	3%	2%	46%	0%	0%	3%	17%
Dan Jones & Associates	September 14–20, 2017	600	± 4.0%	16.67%	6.00%	–	–	54.33%	–	–	–	–
Dan Jones & Associates	August 30 – September 5, 2017	607	± 4.0%	19.82%	5.59%	2.78%	0.99%	50.17%	0.99%	0.16%	1.82%	17.69%

=== Results ===
Utah's 3rd congressional district special election, 2017
Party	Candidate	Votes	%
Republican	John Curtis	85,751	58.02%
Democratic	Kathie Allen	37,801	25.58%
United Utah	Jim Bennett	13,747	9.30%
Independent	Sean Whalen	4,554	3.08%
Libertarian	Joe Buchman	3,644	2.47%
Independent American	Jason Christensen	2,286	1.55%
Write-in	Brendan Phillips	8	0.01%
Write-in	Russell Paul Roesler	5	0.00%
Total votes		147,796	100.00%
Republican hold			

=== By county ===
County	Curtis Votes	Curtis %	Allen Votes	Allen %	Bennett Votes	Bennett %	Whalen Votes	Whalen %	Buchman Votes	Buchman %	Christensen Votes	Christensen %	Total
Carbon	1,675	47.36%	1,327	37.52%	304	8.59%	114	3.22%	68	1.92%	49	1.39%	3,537
Emery	944	69.16%	228	16.70%	109	7.99%	30	2.20%	22	1.61%	32	2.34%	1,365
Grand	997	32.24%	1,618	52.33%	172	5.56%	209	6.76%	55	1.78%	41	1.33%	3,092
Salt Lake	21,857	43.22%	21,135	41.80%	4,913	9.72%	1,011	2.00%	1,073	2.12%	579	1.14%	50,568
San Juan	1,470	49.07%	1,062	35.45%	180	6.01%	131	4.37%	73	2.44%	80	2.67%	2,996
Utah	55,136	69.33%	10,334	12.99%	7,553	9.50%	2,885	3.63%	2,212	2.78%	1,409	1.77%	79,529
Wasatch	3,660	55.00%	2,074	31.17%	514	7.72%	170	2.55%	140	2.10%	96	1.44%	6,654
