= Dana Layton =

American politician

Member of the Utah House of Representatives from the 60th district
- In office January 1, 2013 – December 31, 2014
- Preceded by: Brad Daw
- Succeeded by: Brad Daw

Personal details
- Party: Republican
- Education: Brigham Young University; Marriott School of Management
- Website: danalayton.com

Dana L. Layton is an American politician and a former Republican member of the Utah House of Representatives. She represented District 60 from January 1, 2013, to December 31, 2014.

== Early life and career ==
Layton earned her BA in design from Brigham Young University and her MBA from its Marriott School of Management. Layton is a self-employed Production Executive and CEO of Layton Productions and Best of State Promotions. Layton lives in Orem, Utah with her husband and five children.

== Political career ==
- 2012 Layton was selected by the Republican convention from two candidates to challenge District 60 incumbent Republican Representative Bradley Daw in the June 26, 2012 Republican Primary, which she won with 2,285 votes (52.4%) and won the November 6, 2012 General election with 10,801 votes (83.9%) against Democratic nominee Emmanuel Kepas.

During the 2013 and 2014 legislative sessions, Representative Layton served on the Higher Education Appropriations Subcommittee, the House Business and Labor Committee, and the House Law Enforcement and Criminal Justice Committee. During the interim, Layton served on the Business and Labor Interim Committee as well as the Law Enforcement and Criminal Justice Interim Committee. In the 2014 primary election she lost a primary challenge to former representative Brad Daw. The vote was 1347 to 1584

== 2014 Sponsored Legislation ==
Bill number	Bill name	Bill status
HB0184	Alimony Modifications	House/ filed - 3/13/2014
HB0242S02	Powers and Duties of the State Board of Education	Governor Signed - 4/1/2014
HB0397	Student and Family Privacy Amendments	House/ filed - 3/13/2014

Representative Layton did not floor sponsor any bills in the 2014 General Legislative Session.
