= Danny Ainge =

American basketball executive and player (born 1959)

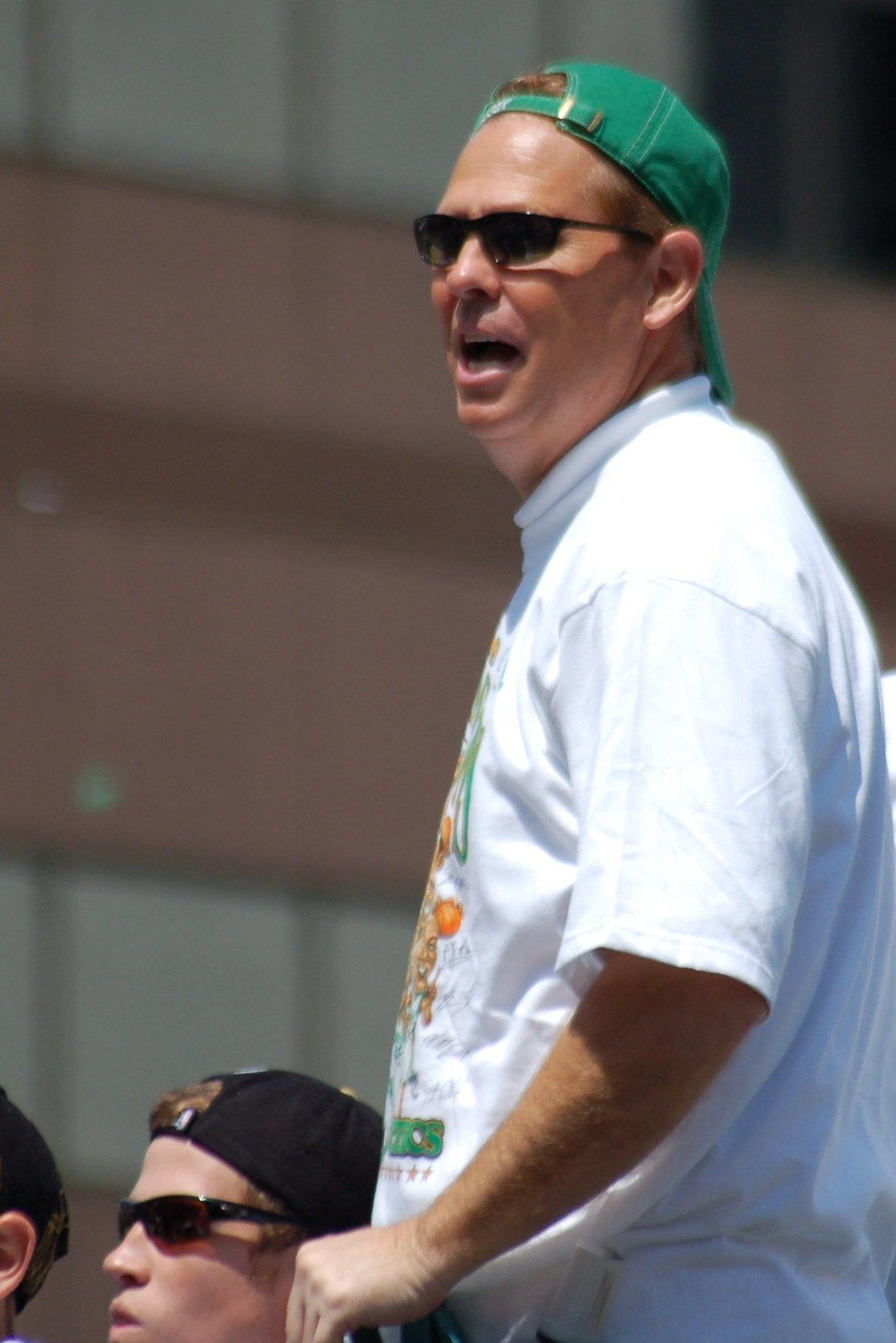
- Ainge during the Celtics' championship parade in 2008

Utah Jazz
- Title: CEO of basketball operations / alternate governor
- League: NBA

Personal information
- Born: March 17, 1959 (age 67) Eugene, Oregon, U.S.
- Listed height: 6 ft 5 in (1.96 m)
- Listed weight: 175 lb (79 kg)

Career information
- High school: North Eugene (Eugene, Oregon)
- College: BYU (1977–1981)
- NBA draft: 1981: 2nd round, 31st overall pick
- Drafted by: Boston Celtics
- Playing career: 1981–1995
- Position: Shooting guard / point guard
- Number: 44, 7, 9, 22
- Coaching career: 1996–1999

Career history

Playing
- 1981–1989: Boston Celtics
- 1989–1990: Sacramento Kings
- 1990–1992: Portland Trail Blazers
- 1992–1995: Phoenix Suns

Career highlights
- As player: 2× NBA champion (1984, 1986); NBA All-Star (1988); John R. Wooden Award (1981); NABC Player of the Year (1981); Consensus first-team All-American (1981); Third-team All-American – NABC (1980); Fourth-team All-American – NABC (1979); WAC Player of the Year (1981); 4× First-team All-WAC (1978–1981); No. 22 retired by BYU Cougars; Second-team Parade All-American (1977); As executive: NBA champion (2008); NBA Executive of the Year (2008)

Career NBA statistics
- Points: 11,964 (11.5 ppg)
- Assists: 4,199 (4.0 apg)
- Steals: 1,133 (1.1 spg)
- Stats at NBA.com
- Stats at Basketball Reference
- Collegiate Basketball Hall of Fame

Danny Ainge
- Second baseman / Third baseman
- Born: March 17, 1959 (age 67); Eugene, Oregon, U.S.
- Batted: Right Threw: Right

MLB debut
- May 21, 1979, for the Toronto Blue Jays

Last MLB appearance
- September 22, 1981, for the Toronto Blue Jays

MLB statistics
- Batting average: .220
- Home runs: 2
- Runs batted in: 37
- Stats at Baseball Reference

Teams
- Toronto Blue Jays (1979–1981)

Daniel Ray Ainge (/ˈeɪndʒ/ AYNJ; born March 17, 1959) is an American former professional basketball player, coach, and professional baseball player who serves as the chief executive officer for the Utah Jazz of the National Basketball Association (NBA). During his 18-year career as general manager for the Boston Celtics, Ainge was known for making bold moves to help the team rebuild, and clearing cap space. He served as the Celtics' president of basketball operations from 2003 until his retirement in 2021.

A three-sport star in high school, Ainge was named to All-America teams in football, basketball, and baseball. At Brigham Young University, he was named national basketball college player of the year and won the John R. Wooden Award for the most outstanding male college basketball player. While in college, Ainge also played parts of three seasons in Major League Baseball with the Toronto Blue Jays, mostly as a second baseman. He was then drafted into the NBA by the Celtics in 1981. Ainge played in the NBA for 14 seasons, playing for the Celtics, Portland Trail Blazers, Sacramento Kings, and Phoenix Suns, primarily as a shooting guard. He went on to coach the Suns for three seasons before joining management of the Celtics, with whom Ainge has three NBA championships to his credit (two as a player, one as a team executive). During his playing career, Ainge appeared in the 1988 All-Star Game. He was the NBA Executive of the Year in 2008.

== Early life ==
Born and raised in Eugene, Oregon, Ainge was a multi-sport star at North Eugene High School. He led the Highlanders' basketball team to consecutive AAA state titles in 1976 and 1977, earning all-state honors both years, and was considered one of the top football recruits in Oregon at wide receiver. As a junior, Ainge was named to the 1977 Parade High School All-America team, and is the only person in history to be a high school first team All-American in football, basketball, and baseball. In 1992, he was inducted into the National High School Hall of Fame.

== College career ==
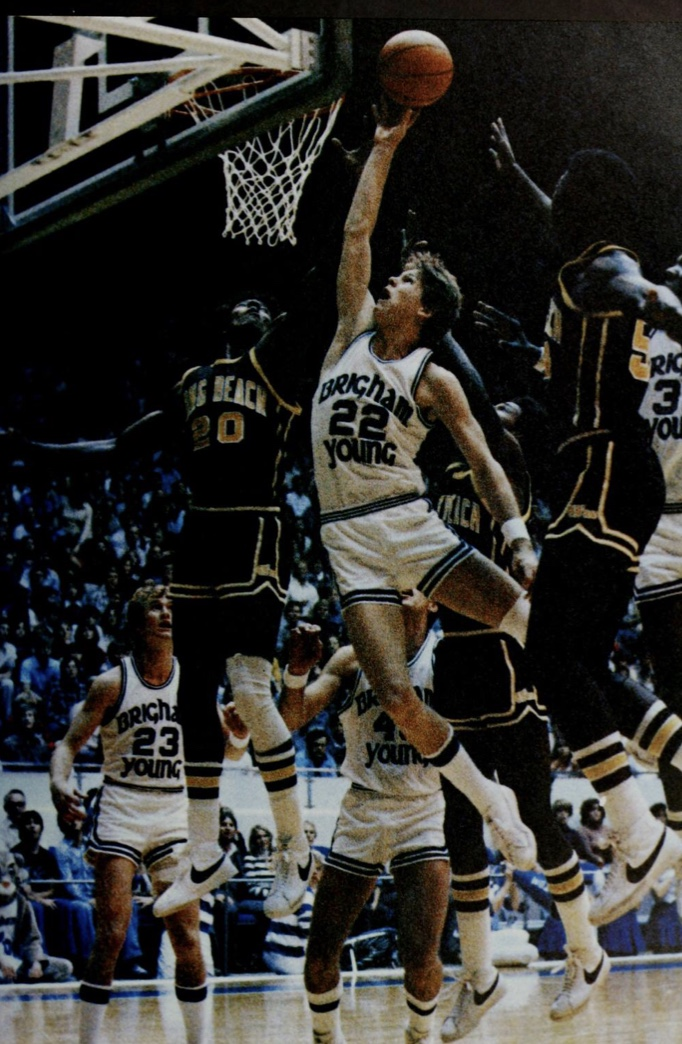
Ainge as a freshman at BYU (1978–79)

Ainge played college basketball at Brigham Young University (BYU) in Provo, Utah. He hit one of the best-known shots in the 1981 NCAA tournament, against Notre Dame in Atlanta in the Sweet Sixteen, when his coast-to-coast drive and lay-up with two seconds remaining gave the Cougars a one-point win. Ainge concluded his senior year by winning the Eastman Award, as well as the John R. Wooden Award—given to the best collegiate player in the nation. During his four-year career at BYU, Ainge was an All-American, a two-time First Team Academic All-American, the WAC Player of the Year and a four-time All-WAC selection. He concluded his college career having scored in double figures in 112 consecutive games, an NCAA record at that time.

== Baseball career ==
=== Toronto Blue Jays (1979–1981) ===
Ainge was selected in baseball's 1977 amateur draft by the Toronto Blue Jays. He made it to the major leagues with the Blue Jays in 1979 while still in college. Mostly a second baseman, Ainge played third base and outfield positions as well, hitting .220 in his baseball career with two home runs and 146 hits in 211 games. Ainge is the second-youngest player in Blue Jays history to hit a home run, at 20 years and 77 days, surpassed only by Vladimir Guerrero Jr.

After three years with the Blue Jays, Ainge decided to pursue a career in basketball and was drafted by the Boston Celtics in the second round (31st overall) of the 1981 NBA draft, who had to buy out Ainge's contract from the Blue Jays after a legal battle.

Ainge is one of 13 athletes who have played in the National Basketball Association and Major League Baseball, along with Frank Baumholtz, Hank Biasatti, Gene Conley, Chuck Connors, Dave DeBusschere, Dick Groat, Steve Hamilton, Mark Hendrickson, Cotton Nash, Ron Reed, Dick Ricketts, and Howie Schultz.

== Basketball career ==
=== Boston Celtics (1981–1989) ===
Not everything went well for Ainge in NBA basketball at first. He had a terrible first day of practice, "shooting 0–2547", Larry Bird wrote in his autobiography Drive: The Story of My Life. Celtics head coach Bill Fitch gave Ainge a rough time, saying his batting average was better than his shooting percentage on the basketball court. But Ainge became an important player for the Celtics teams that won NBA titles in 1984 and 1986.

Ainge played sparingly during his rookie season (1981–82), but broke into the starting lineup in his second year, averaging 9.9 points per game. However, new coach K.C. Jones moved Ainge back to the bench in his third season (1983–84), starting Gerald Henderson instead. Ainge remained an important role player off the bench, helping the Celtics defeat the rival Los Angeles Lakers in the NBA Finals that year. The Celtics traded Henderson to Seattle in the off-season, returning Ainge to the starting guard position opposite Dennis Johnson. Ainge responded by averaging 12.9 points and 5.3 assists per game in 1984–85. He remained a starter for the Celtics for most of the next five seasons. The Celtics won the championship again in 1985–86; that team is widely considered to be one of the greatest in NBA history. In 1986–87, Ainge finished second in the NBA in free throw shooting (89.7%) and third in 3-point shooting (44.3%). The following year, he made 148 3-pointers, shattering the previous NBA single-season record of 92 held by Darrell Griffith of the Utah Jazz. Ainge made his only appearance in the NBA All-Star Game that year, scoring 12 points.

=== Sacramento Kings (1989–1990) ===
In 1989, Ainge was traded to the Sacramento Kings, along with Brad Lohaus, for young center Joe Kleine (whom the Celtics saw as a possible successor to the aging Robert Parish) and Ed Pinckney. Now a featured player on a team with no superstars, Ainge averaged 20.3 points and 6.7 assists per game in that half-season with the Kings. He scored 45 points for the Kings in a loss to the Golden State Warriors, matching a career high that he had set just a few months prior against the Philadelphia 76ers while still playing for the Celtics at that time.

=== Portland Trail Blazers (1990–1992) ===
In 1990, Ainge was traded to the Portland Trail Blazers for Byron Irvin and draft picks. Being a native of Oregon, he was considered a hometown favorite by Blazers fans. On May 5, 1992, Ainge played an important role in the highest scoring NBA postseason game of all time, scoring 25 points and hitting multiple key shots during a 153–151 double overtime win over the Phoenix Suns. The win gave the Blazers a three games to one game lead in the Western Conference Semifinals. Ainge would go on to help the Blazers reach the 1992 NBA Finals, but they would succumb to the Chicago Bulls in six games. On June 5, he scored nine points in the extra period to tie an all-time NBA record for most points in an overtime during a finals game.

=== Phoenix Suns (1992–1995) ===
After the 1991–92 season, Ainge became a free agent. He had stated in media interviews that he ideally wanted to stay in Portland and would contact Blazers management before seriously entertaining offers from other teams. However, on July 1, 1992, Ainge signed a contract with the Phoenix Suns on his first day of free agency. Ainge averaged 11.8 points per game as the Suns went 62–20 that year and reached the NBA finals, where they lost to the Bulls in six games.

On January 18, 1994, he became the second player in NBA history to hit 900 three-point shots (he made 1,002 three-pointers for his career), and he scored 11,964 points for an average of 11.5 points per game, 2,768 rebounds for an average of 2.7, and 4,199 assists, an average of four per game, over 1,042 NBA games.

Ainge retired after the 1994–95 season. At the time of his retirement, he had the highest personal winning percentage in NBA history among players with at least 1,000 career games, edging out Kareem Abdul-Jabbar 69.0% to 68.8%. Ainge was inducted into the Oregon Sports Hall of Fame in 1999.

=== Reputation ===
Throughout his playing career, Ainge was known as a brash, hard-nosed player. In a 1983 playoff game against the Atlanta Hawks, he called 7 ft 1 in (2.16 m) Tree Rollins a "sissy", whereupon Rollins elbowed Ainge in the face. Ainge tackled Rollins and the two began wrestling. Rollins bit Ainge's middle finger so hard that it required two stitches to keep the tendon together. Ainge was ejected from the contest for starting the fight. The incident prompted the headline "Tree Bites Man" on the April 25, 1983, Boston Herald. While playing for the Phoenix Suns in the 1993 season, Ainge got into a tussle with Michael Jordan at midcourt; both were given a technical foul. In a 1994 postseason game, Ainge rifled an inbounding pass at the head of Houston Rockets guard Mario Elie, striking him in the face and snapping his neck back. Ainge is still known to some as "The Moaning Mormon".

== Coaching career ==
Ainge rejoined the Phoenix Suns as an assistant to head coach Cotton Fitzsimmons in May 1996. On November 14, 1996, Fitzsimmons retired after the Suns started the season with an 0–8 record and Ainge was appointed as his replacement. During his first season coaching the Suns, Ainge got into an on-court altercation with player Robert Horry, which led to Horry throwing a towel at Ainge afterward. This incident eventually forced the Suns to trade Horry to the Los Angeles Lakers for Ainge's old teammate Cedric Ceballos. Despite early struggles, Ainge would lead the Suns into the 1997 NBA playoffs after they started the season with a 0–13 record.

On December 14, 1999, Ainge resigned as head coach of the Suns; he cited a need to spend more time with his family. Ainge had accumulated a 136–90 record during his stint as head coach. Ainge was replaced by assistant coach Scott Skiles.

== Executive career ==
=== Boston Celtics executive ===
In 2003, Ainge was hired as the executive director of Basketball Operations for the Celtics. He has often been controversial in his role as a Celtics executive, trading popular players such as three-time All-Star Antoine Walker (earning himself the nickname "Trader Danny") and having personality conflicts with then-head coach Jim O'Brien (which eventually led to O'Brien's departure to the Philadelphia 76ers). However, Ainge kept the support of both the Celtics' ownership group and—perhaps most importantly—legendary former head coach Red Auerbach, who was employed by the team as a "senior assistant" until his death in October 2006.

The 2006–07 Celtics finished with a 24–58 record, second-worst in the team's history. Following the season, Paul Pierce, team captain and face of the franchise, expressed frustration with the team's failures. He requested a trade to a contender if management were unable to acquire veteran talent of Pierce's caliber.

Ainge responded with two bold moves that changed the franchise's fortunes almost overnight: the 2007 trades for the Minnesota Timberwolves' Kevin Garnett and the Seattle SuperSonics' Ray Allen immediately returned the Celtics to the ranks of the NBA's elite franchises for the first time since the early 1990s. Together with Pierce, they formed a new "Big Three" and led the Celtics to the NBA's best record (66–16) during the 2007–08 season. It was the most dramatic single-season improvement in league history (42 wins more than the previous year), and it earned Ainge the NBA Executive of the Year Award.

Boston faced the Los Angeles Lakers in the 2008 NBA Finals, renewing the long rivalry between the two teams. The Celtics won in six games, giving the franchise its 17th NBA championship. Ainge held the trophy for the first time since winning in 1986. In October 2008, after the Celtics' championship season, he was promoted to President of Basketball Operations.

On May 3, 2010, Ainge was fined $25,000 for tossing a towel to distract then Cleveland Cavaliers forward JJ Hickson shooting a free throw during Game 2 of the Eastern Conference Semifinals.

In 2013, Ainge traded Garnett and Pierce, along with Jason Terry and D. J. White, to the Brooklyn Nets in exchange for five players plus the Nets' first-round picks in 2014, 2016, and 2018. Boston also received the rights to swap picks with Brooklyn in 2017. It is widely considered one of the most lopsided trades in league history, in favor of the Celtics, as the players from the trade became franchise cornerstones Jayson Tatum and Jaylen Brown. The trade would ultimately be instrumental in helping the Celtics win the 2024 NBA Finals long after Ainge left the team.

On August 22, 2017, Ainge made another blockbuster deal, trading All-Star point guard Isaiah Thomas, as well as Jae Crowder, Ante Žižić and the rights to the Nets' 2018 first-round draft pick, to the Cleveland Cavaliers for All-Star Kyrie Irving. Eight days later, the deal also included a 2020 second-round pick from the Miami Heat as compensation relating to a prior injury to Thomas. This move, however, wasn't as successful for the Celtics by comparison, as Irving eventually left the Celtics for the Brooklyn Nets after two seasons of play for them. Irving, however, later played for the Celtics' opponents in the 2024 NBA Finals, the Dallas Mavericks.

On June 2, 2021, Ainge announced his retirement and named head coach Brad Stevens as his replacement as President of Basketball Operations. Ainge helped return the Celtics to the status of consistent contenders, guiding the team to 15 playoff appearances in 18 seasons at the helm after the team had only reached the postseason four times in 11 years prior to his arrival.

=== Utah Jazz executive ===
On December 15, 2021, Ainge was hired as the CEO of basketball operations and alternate governor of the Utah Jazz.

Ainge's first transaction was hiring the new head coach Will Hardy after Quin Snyder announced his resignation as head coach. In the 2022 NBA offseason, Ainge traded Rudy Gobert to Minnesota and Donovan Mitchell to Cleveland. In return of these two major trades, the Jazz received Lauri Markkanen, Collin Sexton (via sign-and-trade), Malik Beasley, Jarred Vanderbilt, rights to the 14th and the 22nd picks (Ochai Agbaji and Walker Kessler) respectively, seven first-round picks and four first-round pick swaps. Ainge's third move was at the 2023 Trade Deadline. To clear cap space, he traded Mike Conley to Minnesota, and Malik Beasley and Jarred Vanderbilt to the Lakers. In return, the Jazz received Russell Westbrook (who later bought out the contract to sign with the Clippers), Juan Toscano-Anderson, Damian Jones and a 2027 first-round pick. Ainge also signed young prospects Kris Dunn, Luka Samanic, and Vernon Carey Jr.

== Other pursuits ==
In 1996, Ainge made an appearance in the sports comedy film Space Jam, playing himself while as a member of the Phoenix Suns. While only a brief appearance, Ainge was dubbed "The Bad Shot Guy" after catching and shooting the ball at the same time while Charles Barkley roamed the court after having his skills stolen by the Monstars.

While a player with the Suns, Ainge opened a national chain of hat stores which he has since sold. Ainge has volunteered at a number of charitable organizations. Ainge also served as a commentator for the NBA on TNT.

== Personal life ==
Ainge and his wife, Michelle, reside in Wellesley, Massachusetts; they have six children, one of whom, Austin, is president of basketball operations for the Utah Jazz and like his father, played basketball at BYU. Another of his sons, Tanner, served as a Utah County Commissioner and ran unsuccessfully for Utah's 3rd congressional district in 2017, losing in the Republican primary election to the eventual winner, future Senator John Curtis.

Ainge's nephew, Erik Ainge, was the starting quarterback on the football team at the University of Tennessee and was selected by the New York Jets in the 5th round of the 2008 NFL draft. Another nephew, Jake Toolson, played the shooting guard position for BYU and signed an Exhibit-10 contract with the Utah Jazz in 2020.

Ainge and his family are active members of the Church of Jesus Christ of Latter-day Saints, in which Ainge served as a bishop.

Ainge had a mild heart attack in 2009, and another in 2019. He has ADHD, according to a personality test Ainge took when Doc Rivers was coaching the Celtics.

== NBA career statistics ==
Legend
| GP | Games played | GS | Games started | MPG | Minutes per game |
| FG% | Field goal percentage | 3P% | 3-point field goal percentage | FT% | Free throw percentage |
| RPG | Rebounds per game | APG | Assists per game | SPG | Steals per game |
| BPG | Blocks per game | PPG | Points per game | **Bold** | Career high |
| † | Won an NBA championship |

=== Regular season ===
| Year | Team | GP | GS | MPG | FG% | 3P% | FT% | RPG | APG | SPG | BPG | PPG |
|---|---|---|---|---|---|---|---|---|---|---|---|---|
| 1981–82 | Boston | 53 | 1 | 10.6 | .357 | .294 | .862 | 1.1 | 1.6 | 0.7 | 0.1 | 4.1 |
| 1982–83 | Boston | 80 | 76 | 25.6 | .496 | .172 | .742 | 2.7 | 3.1 | 1.4 | 0.1 | 9.9 |
| 1983–84† | Boston | 71 | 3 | 16.3 | .460 | .273 | .821 | 1.6 | 2.3 | 0.6 | 0.1 | 5.4 |
| 1984–85 | Boston | 75 | 73 | 34.2 | **.529** | .268 | .868 | 3.6 | 5.3 | **1.6** | 0.1 | 12.9 |
| 1985–86† | Boston | 80 | 78 | 30.1 | .504 | .356 | **.904** | 2.9 | 5.1 | 1.2 | 0.1 | 10.7 |
| 1986–87 | Boston | 71 | 66 | 35.2 | .486 | **.443** | .897 | 3.4 | 5.6 | 1.4 | 0.2 | 14.8 |
| 1987–88 | Boston | **81** | **81** | **37.3** | .491 | .415 | .878 | 3.1 | 6.2 | 1.4 | 0.2 | 15.7 |
| 1988–89 | Boston | 45 | 28 | 30.0 | .460 | .374 | .891 | 3.4 | 4.8 | 1.2 | 0.0 | 15.9 |
| 1988–89 | Sacramento | 28 | 26 | 36.7 | .452 | .387 | .813 | 3.6 | **6.7** | 1.5 | **0.3** | **20.3** |
| 1989–90 | Sacramento | 75 | 68 | 36.4 | .438 | .374 | .831 | **4.3** | 6.0 | 1.5 | 0.2 | 17.9 |
| 1990–91 | Portland | 80 | 0 | 21.4 | .472 | .406 | .826 | 2.6 | 3.6 | 0.8 | 0.2 | 11.1 |
| 1991–92 | Portland | **81** | 6 | 19.7 | .442 | .339 | .824 | 1.8 | 2.5 | 0.9 | 0.2 | 9.7 |
| 1992–93 | Phoenix | 80 | 0 | 27.0 | .462 | .403 | .848 | 2.7 | 3.3 | 0.9 | 0.1 | 11.8 |
| 1993–94 | Phoenix | 68 | 1 | 22.9 | .417 | .328 | .830 | 1.9 | 2.6 | 0.8 | 0.1 | 8.9 |
| 1994–95 | Phoenix | 74 | 1 | 18.6 | .460 | .364 | .808 | 1.5 | 2.8 | 0.6 | 0.1 | 7.7 |
| **Career** | | 1042 | 508 | 26.6 | .469 | .378 | .846 | 2.7 | 4.0 | 1.1 | 0.1 | 11.5 |
| All-Star | | 1 | 0 | 19.0 | .364 | .750 | .500 | 3.0 | 2.0 | 1.0 | 0.0 | 12.0 |

=== Playoffs ===
| Year | Team | GP | GS | MPG | FG% | 3P% | FT% | RPG | APG | SPG | BPG | PPG |
|---|---|---|---|---|---|---|---|---|---|---|---|---|
| 1982 | Boston | 10 | 0 | 12.9 | .422 | **.500** | .769 | 1.3 | 1.1 | 0.2 | 0.1 | 5.0 |
| 1983 | Boston | 7 | 7 | 28.7 | .389 | .400 | .727 | 2.0 | 3.6 | 0.7 | 0.1 | 9.4 |
| 1984† | Boston | 19 | 0 | 13.3 | .456 | .222 | .700 | 0.8 | 2.0 | 0.5 | 0.1 | 4.8 |
| 1985 | Boston | 21 | **21** | 32.7 | .466 | .438 | .769 | 2.8 | 5.8 | 1.5 | 0.0 | 11.0 |
| 1986† | Boston | 18 | 18 | 36.2 | **.554** | .412 | .867 | **4.2** | 5.2 | **2.3** | 0.1 | **15.6** |
| 1987 | Boston | 20 | 19 | 38.1 | .487 | .438 | .861 | 2.6 | 4.6 | 1.2 | **0.2** | 14.8 |
| 1988 | Boston | 17 | 17 | **39.4** | .386 | .328 | .881 | 3.1 | **6.4** | 0.5 | 0.1 | 11.6 |
| 1991 | Portland | 16 | 0 | 17.3 | .448 | .306 | .821 | 1.8 | 1.9 | 0.8 | **0.2** | 8.0 |
| 1992 | Portland | 21 | 0 | 21.4 | .479 | .404 | .830 | 1.9 | 2.3 | 0.7 | 0.0 | 10.6 |
| 1993 | Phoenix | **24** | 0 | 24.6 | .376 | .413 | .872 | 2.5 | 2.3 | 0.5 | 0.1 | 8.1 |
| 1994 | Phoenix | 10 | 0 | 23.0 | .458 | .425 | .714 | 2.3 | 2.1 | 0.6 | 0.1 | 8.6 |
| 1995 | Phoenix | 10 | 0 | 13.7 | .500 | .462 | **.909** | 1.0 | 1.0 | 0.5 | 0.0 | 6.0 |
| **Career** | | 193 | 82 | 26.1 | .456 | .397 | .829 | 2.3 | 3.4 | 0.9 | 0.1 | 9.9 |

== Head coaching record ==
Legend
| Regular season | G | Games coached | W | Games won | L | Games lost | W–L % | Win–loss % |
| Playoffs | PG | Playoff games | PW | Playoff wins | PL | Playoff losses | PW–L % | Playoff win–loss % |

| Team | Year | G | W | L | W–L% | Finish | PG | PW | PL | PW–L% | Result |
|---|---|---|---|---|---|---|---|---|---|---|---|
| Phoenix | 1996–97 | 74 | 40 | 34 | .541 | 4th in Pacific | 5 | 2 | 3 | .400 | Lost in First Round |
| Phoenix | 1997–98 | 82 | 56 | 26 | .683 | 3rd in Pacific | 4 | 1 | 3 | .250 | Lost in First Round |
| Phoenix | 1998–99 | 50 | 27 | 23 | .540 | 3rd in Pacific | 3 | 0 | 3 | .000 | Lost in First Round |
| Phoenix | 1999–2000 | 20 | 13 | 7 | .650 | (resigned) | — | — | — | — | – |
| Career | | 226 | 136 | 90 | .602 | | 12 | 3 | 9 | .250 | |

== See also ==
- List of NBA career playoff games played leaders
- List of multi-sport athletes
- List of National Basketball Association team presidents
