= Jon Stanard =

American politician

Member of the Utah House of Representatives from the 62nd district
- In office January 1, 2013 – February 7, 2018
- Preceded by: Christopher Herrod
- Succeeded by: Travis Seegmiller

Personal details
- Party: Republican
- Education: Dixie State College
- Website: jonstanard.com

Jon E. Stanard is an American politician. He was a Republican member of the Utah House of Representatives representing District 62 from January 1, 2013, until February 7, 2018, when he resigned. He lives in St. George, Utah.

== Early life and education ==
Stanard earned his bachelor's degree in computer information technology from Dixie State College (now Utah Tech University). He continued his education over the years by taking additional classes on government and history, as well as courses from the Leadership Institute, a training program for conservatives headed by Morton Blackwell.

== Political career ==
Stanard was first elected on November 6, 2012. During the 2016 Legislative Session, he served on the Higher Education Appropriations Subcommittee, House Rules Committee, House Business and Labor Committee and the House Revenue and Taxation Committee.

Stanard resigned from the Utah House of Representatives February 7, 2018 citing "personal and family concerns." The next day, the Daily Mail, a British tabloid, published a report alleging Stanard paid $250 for each of two sexual encounters with a Salt Lake City call girl. The Utah House of Representatives opened an investigation into these allegations. The investigation was closed since Stanard was no longer a public lawmaker.

== 2016 sponsored legislation ==
Bill	Status
HB 23- Privilege Tax Amendments	Passed, signed by Governor on 3/29/16
HB 24- Aeronautics Restricted Account Amendments	Passed, signed by Governor on 3/18/16
HB 44- Occupational and Professional Licensure Review Committee Amendments	House/ filed 3/10/16
HB 177 - Mortgage Lending Amendments	Passed, signed by Governor on 3/21/16
HB 301 - School Bus Route Grant Program	Passed, signed by Governor on 3/23/16

Representative Stanard floor sponsored SB 41 Appointment of County Assessors, SB 42 Public Notice of Court Recording, and SCR 6 Concurrent Resolution Recognizing the 20th Anniversary of the Utah Educational Savings Plan.

== Elections ==
- 2012 When District 62 incumbent Republican representative Christopher Herrod left the Legislature, Stanard was chosen from among four candidates at the Republican convention and won the November 6, 2012, general election with 9,774 votes (74.2%) against Democratic nominee Brent Holloway.
- 2014 Stanard was unopposed in the Republican convention and won the November 4, 2014 general election against Democratic nominee Shirley J. Nelson with 5,391 votes (81.1%).
