= Lisa Hopkins Seegmiller =

American opera singer

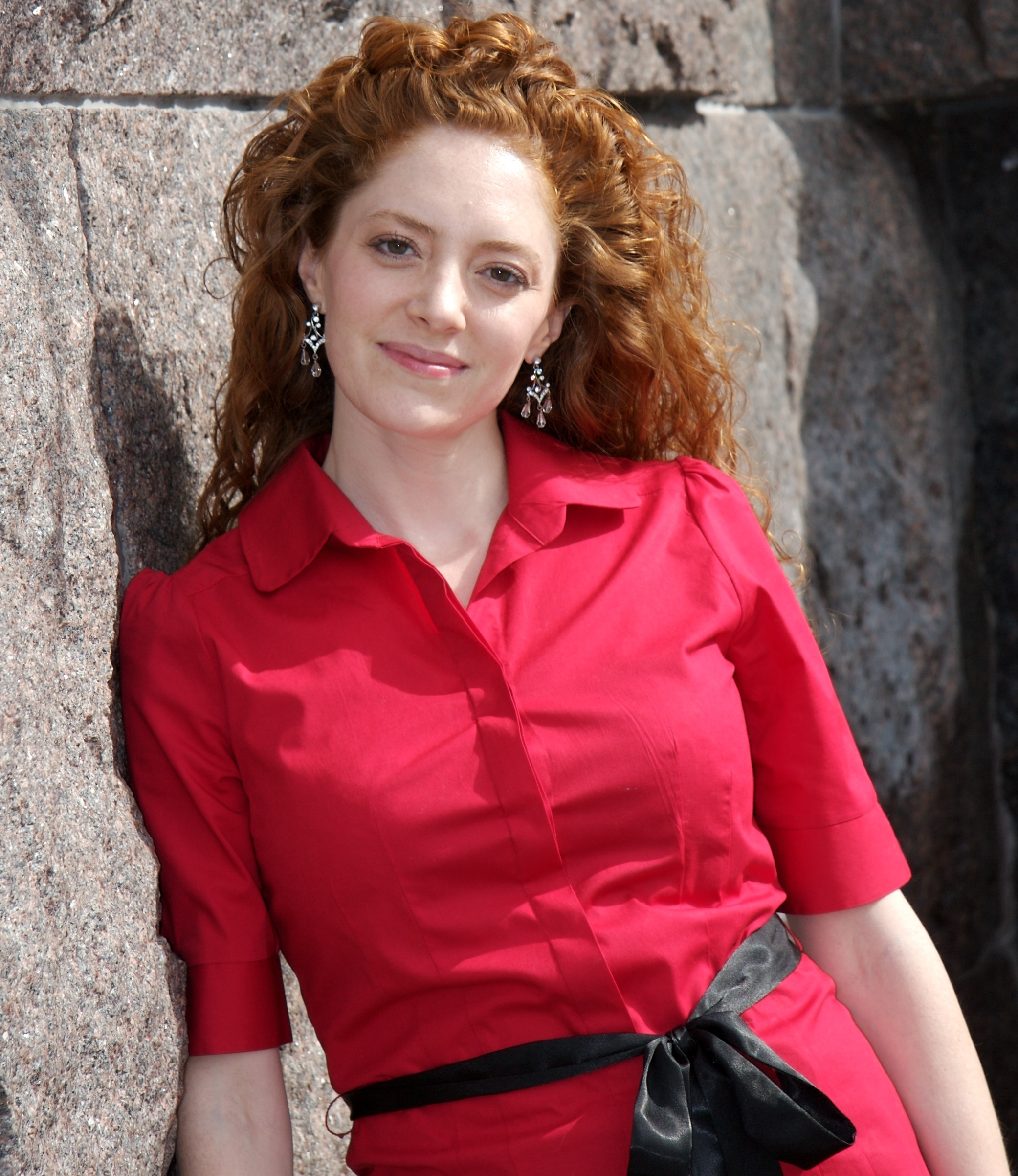
Lisa Hopkins Seegmiller in 2008

Lisa Hopkins Seegmiller (born 1978), credited as Lisa Hopkins until 2008, is an American classical singer and actress from Simi Valley, California. She holds a B.A. in Theater Studies and Acting from Yale University and a M.M. in Classical Voice from the Manhattan School of Music.

She is best known for her portrayal of Mimi in Baz Luhrmann's 2002–03 production of La bohème on Broadway, for which she received a 2003 Tony Award. Since then, Seegmiller has performed around the United States and Europe in concerts, operas and musical theatre, at venues such as the Estates Theatre in Prague, Wolf Trap in Virginia, the Brooklyn Academy of Music, the Utah Symphony and Opera, and at several music festivals. She was nominated for the 2010 Grammy Award for Best Opera Recording for her role in the recording of Volpone with the Wolftrap Opera Company.

== Early life and training ==
Seegmiller was born Lisa Hopkins in Simi Valley, California, and grew up in various places throughout the United States and Canada from Los Angeles to Manhattan, North Dakota, Iowa, Missouri and Utah. Her mother is a Juilliard-trained pianist with whom she has collaborated. She attended the Waterford School in Sandy, Utah, and began to study voice at age 16.

Seegmiller received her B.A. in Theater Studies and Acting from Yale University in 2001. After her freshman year at Yale, she studied at the Scuola Insieme in Grado, Italy. The following summer she played the role of Polly Peachum in The Threepenny Opera at the Chautauqua Institution Music Festival. Upon her return to Yale her sophomore year, she founded the Yale College Opera Company, playing Cleopatra in Handel's Giulio Cesare and performing Poulenc's one-woman opera, La Voix Humaine for her senior project. She also sang the role of Casilda in The Gondoliers for Yale's Gilbert and Sullivan Society, among other roles. Between her junior and senior years at Yale, Seegmiller took a break to perform on tour as a soprano soloist in 21 multimedia spiritual concerts in Graz, Klagenfurt, Salzburg, and Vienna, Austria, while serving as a missionary for the Church of Jesus Christ of Latter-day Saints. She received her M.M. in Classical Voice from the Manhattan School of Music in 2003, where she studied with Marlena Malas. In the summer of 2004, she studied at the International Vocal Arts Institute in Tel Aviv, Israel with Trish McCaffrey.

== Career ==
In 2002–03, while Seegmiller completed her master's degree, she appeared on Broadway in Baz Luhrmann's production of La bohème in the leading role of Mimi, sharing in a special ensemble Tony Award. Ben Brantley of The New York Times noted, "The principals are, to a person, sexy, vital, utterly committed to the moment.... [At] the end of Act III... Jesús Garcia and Lisa Hopkins are affectingly somber... with resigned postures that suggest a haunted awareness of doom.... They brought tears to my eyes." Seegmiller also appears on the production's cast album, singing the final act, and she sang excerpts from the role at the televised performance during the 2003 Tony Awards ceremony at Radio City Music Hall.

Seegmiller was the soprano soloist in the Mozart Requiem and Mozart's Exsultate, jubilate with the Utah Symphony and Opera at the 2004 Deer Valley Music Festival. She was chosen to present a solo recital in March 2005, on the Marilyn Horne Foundation roster, at St. Bartholomew's Church in New York City as part of the "On Wings of Song" series. The same year, she created the role of Arianna in the U.S. premiere of Arianna in Creta with the Gotham Chamber Opera in New York City and played Cio-Cio San as a guest artist in a production of Madama Butterfly at the University of Nebraska–Lincoln. In 2006, Seegmiller received critical praise as Donna Anna in Don Juan in Prague, an avant-garde adaptation of Don Giovanni, first performed in October 2006 at the Prague National Theatre and then in December 2006 at the BAM New Wave Festival in Brooklyn, New York. Newsday wrote, "The only member of the cast to escape the director's unmusical ministrations was Lisa Hopkins, who, as Donna Anna, managed to ignore the squeezebox screeches coming from the pit and speakers and deliver a sensitive lament."

In 2007, Opera News called Seegmiller "the kind of camera-ready young singer today's marketing directors dream of. ... Fortunately, unlike all too many so-termed 'total package' artists these days [she] can also sing." She sang the role of Sofia in Rossini's one-act opera Il Signor Bruschino with Gotham Chamber Opera in January 2007. Backstage commented on the performance, "soprano Lisa Hopkins as Sofia proves a deft comedian while singing with impressive flair." Seegmiller was also selected as a Wolf Trap Opera Company Filene Young Artist, singing the role of Corvina in John Musto's adaptation of Volpone (June, 2007) and the First Lady in Die Zauberflöte (August, 2007). The Washington Post wrote, "Lisa Hopkins Seegmiller, so expressive with her big Bette Davis eyes and fluttery voice, was deliciously funny as Corvina" (in Volpone) The recording of Volpone (and Seegmiller as a principal soloist) was nominated for the 2010 Grammy Award for Best Opera Recording. In December 2007, she was the soprano soloist in the Messiah in Greenwich, Connecticut.

In the summer of 2008, Seegmiller was a resident artist at the Greenwich Music Festival, appearing as Amore in Claudio Monteverdi's Return of Ulysses and the soprano soloist in the love songs from Monteverdi's Eighth Book of Madrigals. After giving birth to her first child in 2008, Seegmiller returned to the concert stage in May 2009, performing in the Sing for Hope benefit concert at Yale University and the Bernstein MASS with the Utah Symphony. She was a soprano soloist at the Virginia Arts Festival in Bernstein’s MASS in April 2010. From June to August 2010, Seegmiller played Grizabella in Cats at the Tuacahn Amphitheater in Ivins, Utah. The review in The Salt Lake Tribune commented that in the show's signature song, "Memory", she "creates a moment that's beautifully painful ... and melancholy with a glimmer of hope. Her voice seems to penetrate each word of the familiar lyrics, extracting the core meaning". In October 2011, Seegmiller performed at the Mentors International 2011 Gala.

In 2013, she revisited the role of Mimi in Utah Lyric Opera's production of La bohème and, immediately afterwards, in Sun Valley Opera's production in Idaho. The following year, she played The Narrator in Tuacahn's production of Joseph and the Amazing Technicolor Dreamcoat, "exuding a warmth and beauty in her stage presence". In 2016, she played Mrs. Darling in Peter Pan at the Tuacahn. In 2001 she appeared in several concerts of songs by Andrew Lloyd Webber at the Eccles Theater in Salt Lake City. She also performs a one-woman show called "Billboard & Operatic Hits of the Decades".

Since 2012, Seegmiller has been the artistic director of St. George Opera. She continues to sing in concerts, teaches voice privately and is a visiting member of the Voice Faculty at Dixie State University.

== Personal life ==
Lisa Seegmiller married Travis Seegmiller in 2006. She lives in St. George, Utah, with her husband and children.
