= Brad Daw =

Member of the Utah House of Representatives

Member of the Utah House of Representatives from the 60th district
- In office January 1, 2015 – January 1, 2021
- Preceded by: Dana Layton
- Succeeded by: Nelson Abbott
- In office January 1, 2004 – January 1, 2013
- Succeeded by: Dana Layton

Personal details
- Born: February 7, 1963 (age 63) Provo, Utah, U.S.
- Party: Republican
- Spouse: Laura
- Children: 5
- Education: Brigham Young University (BS); San Jose State University (MS)
- Website: www.braddaw.com

Brad Daw (born February 7, 1963) is an American politician who served as a member of the Utah House of Representatives from 2004 to 2013 and again from 2015 to 2021.

== Early life and career ==
Brad Daw was born in Provo, Utah to Albert M. and Sherrie Daw. He was the first of six children and grew up in Shelley, Idaho. Daw earned a Bachelor of Science degree in electronics engineering from Brigham Young University and a Master of Science in computer engineering from San Jose State University.

== Career ==
In 2004, Daw defeated Calvin Harper in the republican primaries and ran uncontested in the general election for Utah State Representative District 60 seat.

Daw was re-elected in 2006, 2008, and 2010. In 2012, Daw lost to fellow Republican Dana Layton during the primaries by 455 or 9.89% of the vote.

In 2014, Daw challenged Layton and defeated her by a narrow margin with 1,584 votes (54%).He faced Democrat Archie Williams in the general election and won with 5,553 votes (85.2%).

During his tenure in the Utah State legislature, Daw served as the vice chair and chair of the Transportation Committee, vice chair of the Government Operations Committee, and chair of the Health and Human Services Committee. Daw has also served on the following committees: Transportation, Public Utilities and Technology, Workforce Services and Economic Development, Health and Human Services, higher Education Appropriations, Social Services Appropriations, and Health Care Reform Task force.

During the 2016 legislative session, Daw served on the Social Services Appropriations Subcommittee, the House Government Operations Committee, and the House Law Enforcement and Criminal Justice Committee.

In 2017, Daw was a Republican candidate for Utah's 3rd congressional district special election after the resignation of Jason Chaffetz. Daw earned the seventh-most votes at the Republican convention and did not advance to the primary.

Daw works as a software engineer for Adobe Inc. in Lehi, Utah.

== Personal life ==
Daw lives with his wife, Laura, and five children in Orem, Utah.
