= Chris Herrod =

American politician (born 1965)

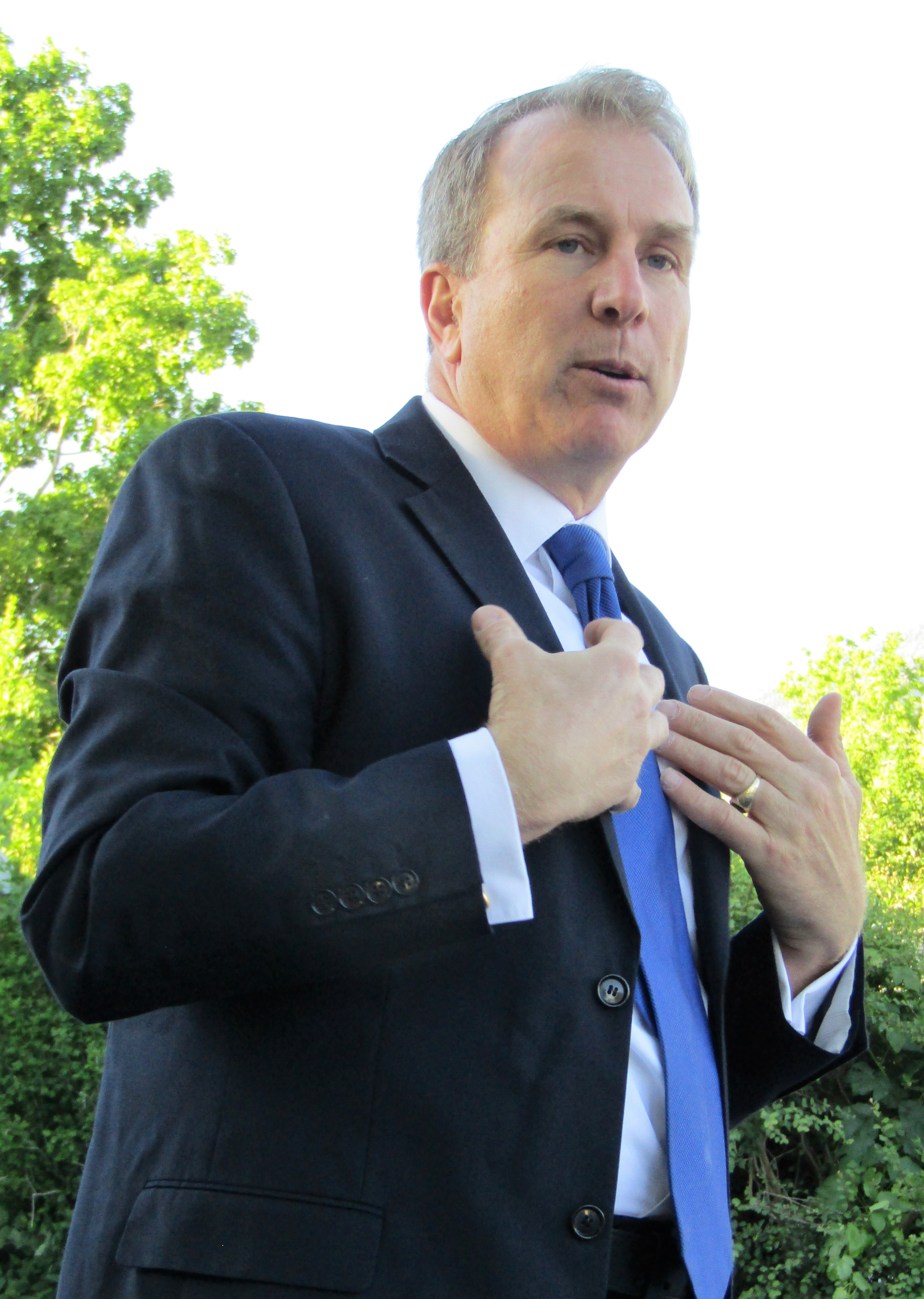

Member of the Utah House of Representatives from the 62nd district
- In office January 4, 2007 – January 1, 2013
- Preceded by: Jeff Alexander
- Succeeded by: Jon Stanard

Personal details
- Born: August 31, 1966 (age 59) Chicago, Illinois, U.S.
- Party: Republican
- Spouse: Alia Herrod
- Children: 5
- Education: Brigham Young University (BA, MA)

Christopher N. Herrod (born August 31, 1965) is a real estate developer and politician from Provo. He was a Republican member of the Utah House of Representatives representing the 62nd district from 2007 to 2012. He was an unsuccessful candidate to replace Jason Chaffetz in the 2017 Utah's 3rd congressional district special election.

In 2016, he ran for the Utah State Senate District 16 seat against incumbent Curt Bramble, he was defeated in the primary.

Herrod was a member of the American Legislative Exchange Council (ALEC), serving as Utah state leader.

== Early life, education, and business career ==
Born in Chicago, Herrod has a B.A. in International Relations and Family Living (1990), and a Master's degree in Organizational Behavior (1992), both from Brigham Young University. He spent 1992-1993 as an assistant professor at Kharkov State University; in 1995–1996, he served as an instructor and advisor at Utah Valley State College's Kyiv affiliate, the Kyiv College of Hotel Management. From 1997 to 1998, he was international marketing director of Neways. After a brief stint at Merck (1998–99), Herrod went into real estate development, as owner/manager of Keystone Developers and Pangaea Development. He has also served as adjunct faculty in international business at Utah Valley University.

== Utah House of Representatives ==
In 2007, incumbent State Representative Jeff Alexander decided to resign from his seat to take a part-time volunteer job in Governor Jon Huntsman Jr.'s economic development office. For the Republican nomination, Provo Republican delegates narrowed the field to two candidates: John Curtis and Chris Herrod. No candidate reached the 60% threshold to avoid an appointment. Utah Republican Party Chairwoman Enid Greene decided to appoint Chris Herrod to the seat, despite him receiving fewer delegate votes than Curtis.

=== Committee assignments ===
For the 2009-2010 session, he was assigned to the House Public Utilities and Technology Committee; and to the House Workforce Services and Community and Economic Development Committee, of which he was Vice Chairman.

== Elections ==
=== 2008 Utah House of Representatives race ===
In 2008, he defeated Democrat Claralyn Hill, a Provo attorney, 59%-41%. In 2010, he won re-election with 69% of the vote.

=== 2012 U.S. Senate race ===
In January 2012, was one of several candidates to announce that he would run for the U.S. Senate election in Utah and would challenge incumbent Orrin Hatch for the Republican nomination. He said "I absolutely hate the direction that we are going in as a nation. I hate socialism." It was Hatch's first primary competition since his election in 1976. Hatch won the primary election easily. Consequently, Herrod did not make it to the general election.

=== 2016 Utah State Senate race ===
In 2016, Chris Herrod was defeated in the primary against incumbent Curt Bramble in the Utah State Senate District 16 race.

=== 2017 U.S. House of Representatives race ===
In 2017, Herrod ran in the special election for Utah's 3rd congressional district to replace Republican Jason Chaffetz, who resigned on June 30. Thirteen days prior to Chaffetz's resignation, on June 17, Herrod emerged victorious in the Republican convention. Lawyer Tanner Ainge and Provo Mayor John Curtis, the latter of whom also competed in the convention, received enough voter signatures to face Herrod in the August 15 primary, where Herrod was defeated by Curtis, garnering 31.1% of the vote to Curtis's 40.5% and Ainge's 28.3%.

=== 2018 U.S. House of Representatives race ===
Herrod challenged incumbent Representative John Curtis in Utah's 3rd congressional district in 2018. Curtis fell shy of the 60% needed to avoid a primary election at the party convention, sending him and Herrod to another primary. Curtis proceeded to win the primary and later the general election.

== Personal life ==
During his teenage years he traveled to Vienna, Hungary, and then-divided Berlin. He is a member of the Church of Jesus Christ of Latter-day Saints, and did his missionary service in Sweden. He is married to Alia, whom he met while in Ukraine; they have four children (Katya, Niles, Dale, and Reagan). Herrod is a scoutmaster, and an active fencer.

Utah House of Representatives
Preceded by Jeff Alexander	Member of the Utah House of Representatives from the 62nd district 2007–2013	Succeeded by Jon Stanard
