= Travis Seegmiller =

American attorney, academic, and politician

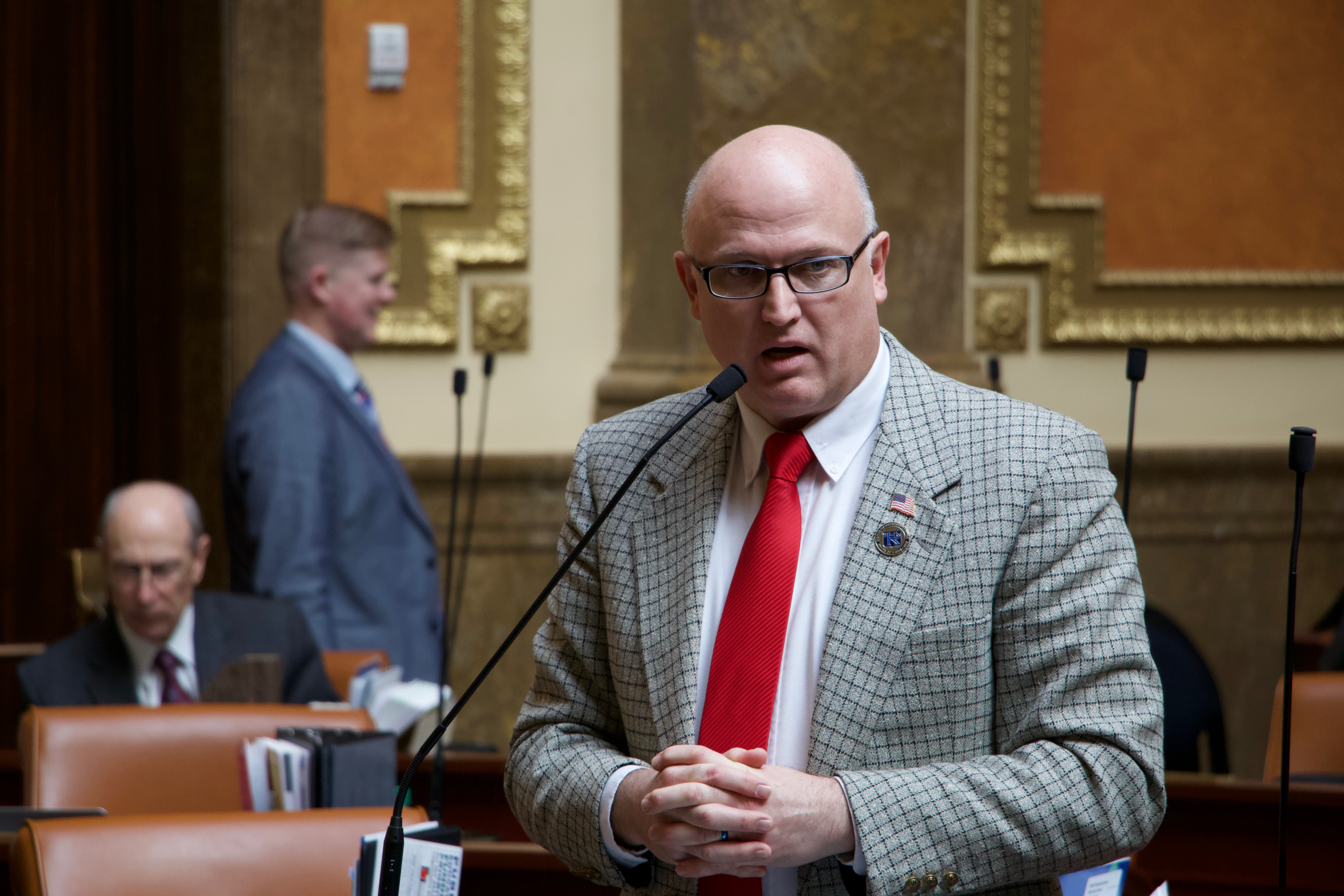

Member of the Utah House of Representatives from the 62nd district
- In office February 14, 2018 – July 1, 2022
- Preceded by: Jon Stanard
- Succeeded by: Colin W. Jack

Personal details
- Party: Republican
- Spouse: Lisa Hopkins Seegmiller
- Education: Yale University (BA); Georgetown University (JD)

Travis Seegmiller is an American attorney, academic, and politician who served as a member of the Utah House of Representatives from the 62nd district. Seegmiller was appointed to the House on February 14, 2018, succeeding Jon Stanard.

== Education ==
Seegmiller earned a Bachelor of Arts degree in Leadership Psychology and International Studies from Yale University and a Juris Doctor from the Georgetown University Law Center.

== Early life and career ==
Upon graduation from law school, Seegmiller worked as an attorney and strategic consultant. He worked as a partner at Squire Patton Boggs in Washington, D.C., and as a strategic management consultant at McKinsey & Company in New York City. Seegmiller also served as a political advisor for the Mitt Romney 2012 presidential campaign. He was also a professor of law and business management at Dixie State University (now known as Utah Tech University.) He was one of two BYU professors ranked as the "hottest" in the country in 2016 by RateMyProfessors.com.

== Utah House of Representatives ==
=== Tenure ===
in 2018, Seegmiller was appointed to the Utah House of Representatives after the resignation of Jon Stanard amid a prostitution scandal. He secured the seat in an eight-way race within the Washington County Republican Party. He won re-election in 2020 with 99.3% of the popular vote in the general election.

=== Poaching case ===
In October 2021, Seegmiller was charged with three misdemeanor offenses (one count of unlawful taking of protected wildlife and two counts of unlawful discharge of a firearm) after taking a doe deer on private land in New Harmony. The case was investigated by the Utah Division of Wildlife Resources and the charge was brought in Washington County Justice Court. Seegmiller faced criticism and calls to resign.

In April 2022, Seegmiller resolved the case through a plea agreement, in which Seegmiller pleaded no contest to "taking wildlife while trespassing"; agreed to pay $800; and agreed to suspension of his hunting privileges for three years; in return, the other two charges were dropped and Seegmiller's plea was "held in abeyance" and would dismissed upon fulfillment of the agreement's terms.

=== Resignation ===
Seegmiller announced on May 10, 2022, his intent to resign from his position effective July 1, 2022, and withdraw his name from consideration in the June 2022 Utah Republican primary election for the same office. While he had recently faced calls to resign, his official memo credits the decision for both actions to his family relocating their residence outside of the district.

== Personal life ==
Seegmiller is married to Lisa Hopkins Seegmiller, a singer and theater actress.
