= Tanner Ainge =

American businessman and politician

- Ainge in 2026

Member of the Utah County Commission
- In office January 7, 2019 – March 2021
- Preceded by: Greg Graves

Personal details
- Born: December 15, 1983 (age 42) Boston, Massachusetts, U.S.
- Party: Republican
- Spouse: Heidi Ainge
- Children: 5
- Parent: Danny Ainge
- Education: Juris Doctor, Northwestern University School of Law; Bachelor of Arts, International Studies, Brigham Young University

Tanner Ainge (born December 15, 1983) is an American businessman and politician who formerly served as a Utah County Commissioner. Ainge is the founder and CEO of Banner Capital Management. In 2021, Ainge was appointed to the governor’s economic development board and has been actively involved in Utah politics. Ainge is also a member of the Utah Army National Guard. He ran an unsuccessful primary race for the U.S. House 3rd Congressional District of Utah against former Provo mayor John Curtis in 2017, but he won the Utah County Commissioner election the following year.

== Personal life and early career ==
Ainge was born December 15, 1983, to Michelle and Danny Ainge, a professional basketball and baseball player.

He attended Brigham Young University where he earned a BA in international studies, and later a juris doctor from Northwestern University School of Law.

Prior to his political career, Ainge worked in private equity and law with national firms HGGC and Kirkland & Ellis and studied Mandarin while living in China. Ainge has also served in the Utah Army National Guard as a JAG officer.

Ainge was a volunteer for Mitt Romney's 2008 presidential campaign for one year.

Ainge and his wife, Heidi, have five children, one of whom was born in Beijing. Their children attend Chinese immersion schools.

== Political career ==
In 2017, a special election was held in the 3rd Congressional District of Utah for the U.S. House of Representatives to replace Jason Chaffetz, who resigned on June 30, 2017. Ainge received a quarter of the Republican primary votes, but placed third against Provo mayor John Curtis and Christopher Herrod. It was suggested by Republican operative, Chuck Warren, and others on Twitter, that Ainge's congressional race could have been negatively influenced by his father, the general manager of the Boston Celtics, convincing Gordon Hayward to leave the Utah Jazz as a free agent and sign with the Celtics.

In 2018, Utah commissioner Greg Graves was called to resign for sexual harassment allegations, but completed his term under tenuous circumstances. In the race for Graves’s seat, Ainge beat fellow Republican Tom Sakievich in the primary election and had no Democratic opposition in the general election. His main opponent was third-party candidate, Teri McCabe, whom he beat with 82% of the vote. In light of the Graves controversies, Ainge said he would run a campaign focused on restoring ethics and transparency to the county commission.

During his two years on the commission, Ainge worked towards balancing the county budget, preserving and creating new recreational areas in the county and enhancing the county’s standards of ethics and good governance. In 2021, Ainge resigned as County Commissioner when he was appointed by Utah governor Spencer J. Cox to serve on the Governor’s Economic Development Board.
