= David Magleby =

David Blyth Magleby (born October 20, 1949) is an American political scientist and professor emeritus of political science at Brigham Young University (BYU) and formerly the dean of the College of Family, Home, and Social Sciences at that institution. He is an expert on direct democracy and campaign finance.

Magleby is the author of several books. His first, Direct Legislation, is considered the seminal work on initiatives and referendums. Along with the other works Magleby has written, he is the lead editor of a series on presidential election finance, including Financing the 2008 Election. He has also written several works on issues related to soft money in campaigns. In 1990, he served on a bipartisan Senate task force on campaign finance reform and his book on the subject, The Money Chase, was published by the Brookings Institution. In addition, Magleby authors a best-selling American government textbook, Government by the People, which, as of late 2012, was in its 25th edition.

Prior to joining the faculty of BYU, Magleby was a professor at the University of California, Santa Cruz and the University of Virginia. Magleby received his bachelor's degree from the University of Utah and his M.A. and Ph.D. from the University of California, Berkeley.

At BYU, Magleby has served as dean, department chair, and founding director of the Center for the Study of Elections and Democracy (CSED). He also established the KBYU/Utah Colleges exit poll which was active for many years. Every election year when it was active, the poll mobilizes several hundred college students from Utah college campuses to gather data about Utah voters and elections. BYU students design the survey and sample. On Election Night, Magleby hosted a television program where students present the results of the poll.

Magleby served as president of political science honors society Pi Sigma Alpha from 1994 to 1996. He was twice awarded the Pi Sigma Alpha Distinguished Faculty Award in Political Science. Other political science organizations he has joined include the American Political Science Association, the International Political Science Association, the Midwest Political Science Association, and the Western Political Science Association.

Magleby is a member of the Church of Jesus Christ of Latter-day Saints (LDS Church). As such, his comments have been sought on Mormon political issues, such as gay marriage and Mitt Romney's presidential campaign. He has also contributed articles on politics to the Encyclopedia of Mormonism and the Encyclopedia of Latter-day Saint History. Despite the Republican image of his LDS faith and home state of Utah, Magleby is a Democrat. Magleby is known for a profile he developed of the ideal Mormon Democrat, in what has been called the "Magleby profile."

David Magleby is married to Linda Waters Magleby, and they have four children. He resides in Provo, Utah.

== Sources ==
- listing of Google Books connected to Magleby
- bio of Magleby
