= Direct-to-consumer automobile selling in the United States =

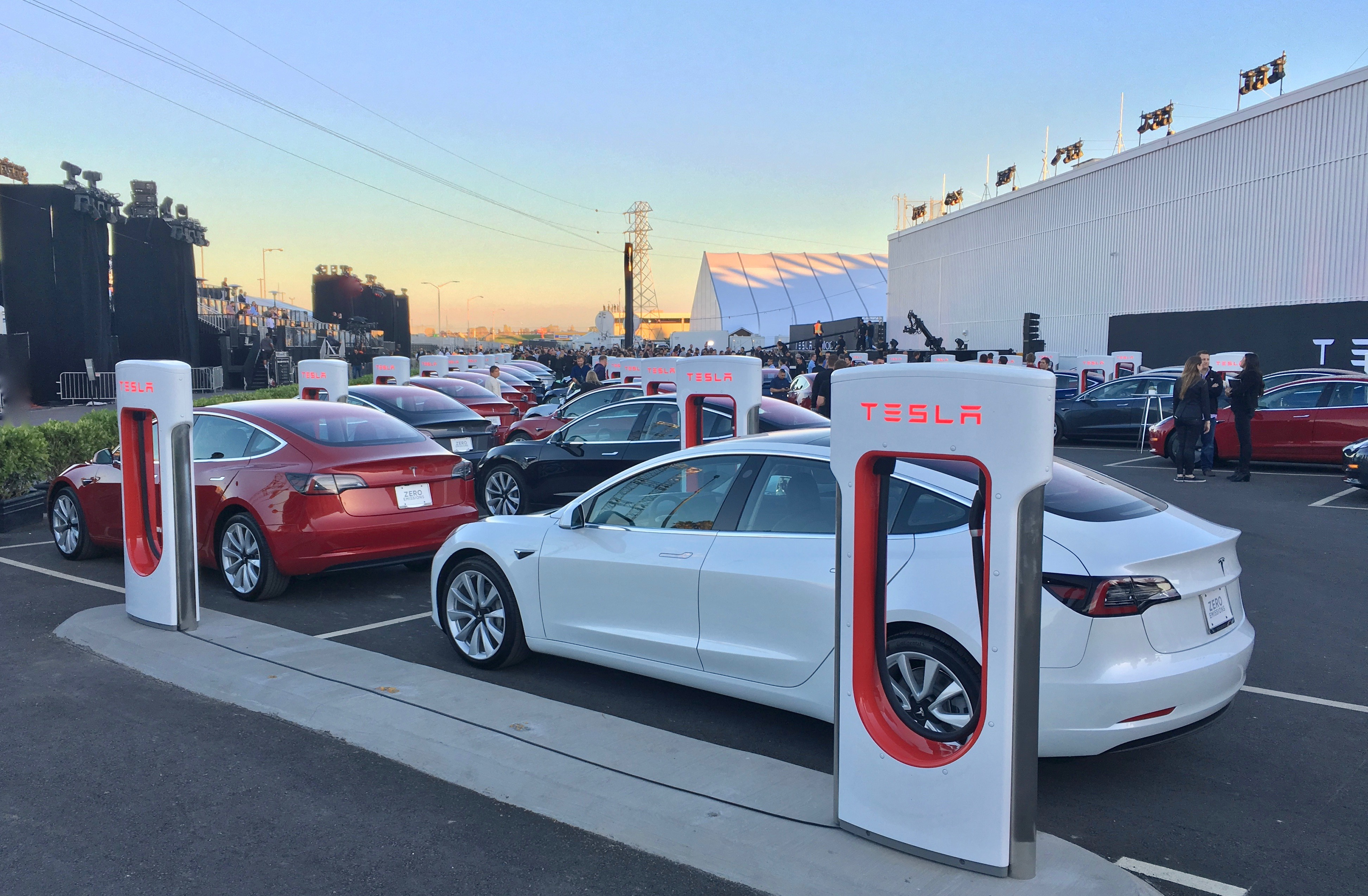
The first production Tesla Model 3 cars ready for delivery directly to consumers.

In the United States, direct-to-consumer selling of automobiles is the practice of automobile manufacturers selling new vehicles directly to consumers without using franchised dealerships as intermediaries. All 50 states have laws that prohibit auto manufacturers from competing with their franchised dealers by selling vehicles directly to customers, with many states also requiring that all new cars be sold by franchised dealers. However, following efforts by Tesla in the 2010s, some states permit direct sales by newer manufacturers that never had franchised dealers, all of which exclusively sell electric vehicles.

== History ==
=== Early direct sales and transition to franchised dealers ===
Early cars were sold by automakers to customers directly from the factory or through a variety of channels, including mail order, department stores, and traveling representatives.

Laws prohibiting direct auto sales arose in the United States in the 1930s, when manufacturers started using independently franchised dealerships to offload the tasks of selling and servicing vehicles. Such regulations protect dealerships from manufacturers opening their own dealerships and competing against resellers, which could be seen as an abuse of the manufacturer-franchise relationship. The laws have been actively defended into the 21st century and extend to online in-state sales. By 2010, all 50 states had laws prohibiting direct sales by manufacturers with franchised dealer networks. Jurisdictions outside the United States do not have such laws protecting car dealerships.

=== Direct sales by Tesla and other EV manufacturers ===
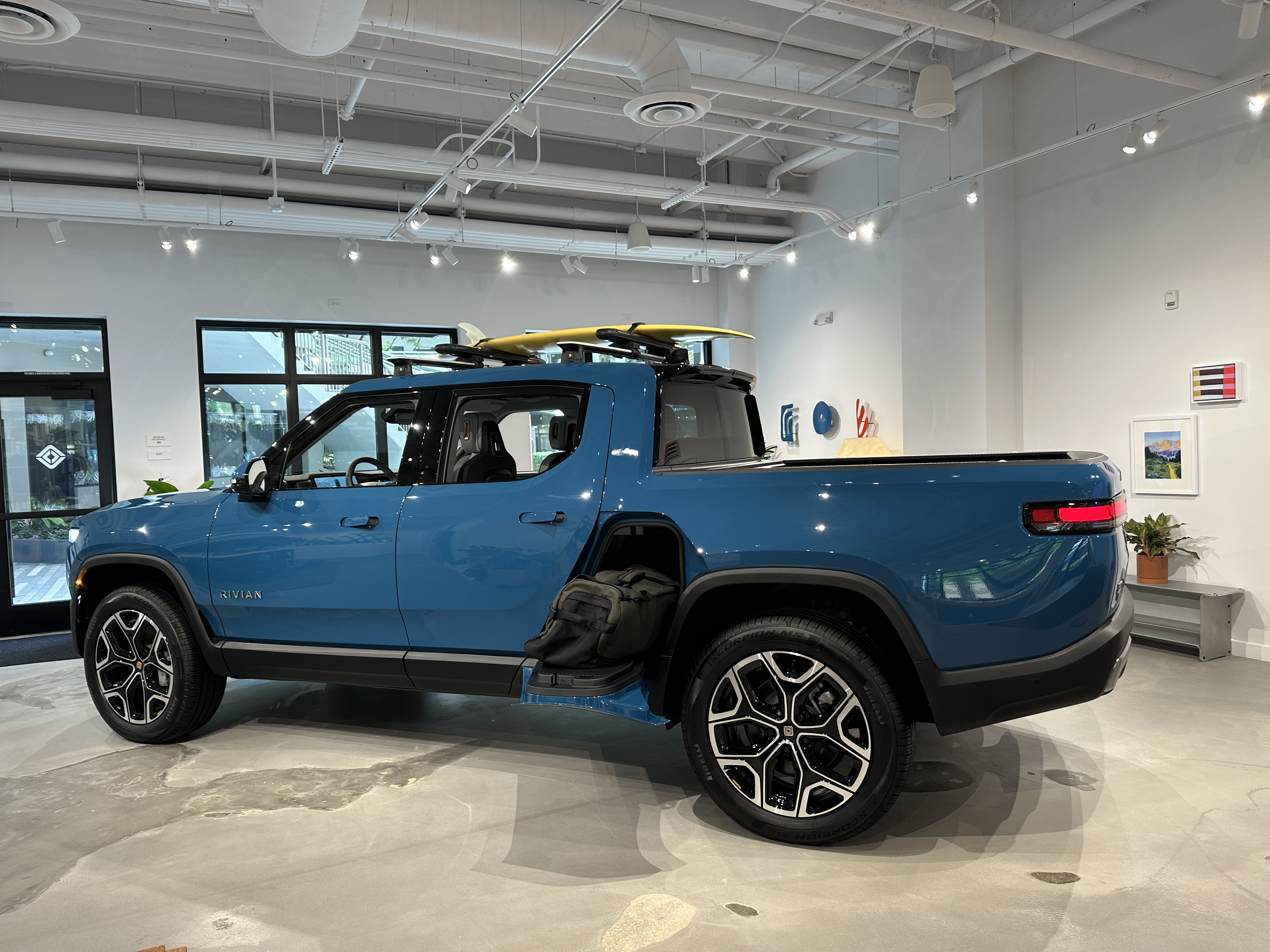
A Rivian showroom in Miami, Florida.

Tesla, Inc. rejected the franchised dealership model when it began selling mass-produced electric vehicles in the 2010s, claiming it cannot rely on third-party dealerships to handle its sales because dealerships do not properly explain the advantages its cars have over vehicles with an internal combustion engine. Tesla CEO Elon Musk said selling its vehicles through dealer networks would create a conflict of interest because they counter-sell the gasoline vehicles that make up the bulk of dealerships' sales and service income. Tesla operates city centre galleries where prospective customers can view cars that can only be ordered online. Tesla sells cars in states where direct sales are prohibited by handling the sale as an out-of-state transaction and shipping the vehicle into the state. The company was the first automaker in the United States to sell cars directly to consumers since the widespread adoption of the franchised dealer model. The direct sales model was similarly adopted by Rivian, Lucid Motors, Polestar and other startups that exclusively produce EVs.

== Notable dealership disputes ==
=== Involving manufacturers without franchised dealers ===
Laws per state regarding direct auto sales Direct auto sales allowed for manufacturers without franchise agreements (Colorado, Maryland and Utah additionally specify EV-only manufacturers) Direct auto sales prohibited with an exemption for Tesla, Inc. only Sovereign tribal nations that allow Tesla direct sales Direct auto sales prohibited for all manufacturers

==== Tesla ====
Tesla has argued that franchise laws prohibiting direct sales do not apply to them because they have never had franchised dealers. Despite this, dealership associations in multiple states have filed lawsuits against Tesla to prevent the company from selling cars. In several states, Tesla is the sole manufacturer permitted to sell vehicles directly.

==== Rivian ====
Rivian sued the Ohio Bureau of Motor Vehicles in August 2025, claiming that the state's car franchise law, which allows only Tesla to sell directly, is anti-consumer. In 2022, Rivian and Lucid Motors won a lawsuit in Illinois and were granted dealer licenses. Rivian has also lobbied Washington lawmakers to change the state's franchise law which also exempts only Tesla.

=== Involving manufacturers with franchised dealers ===
==== Sony Honda Mobility ====
Sony Honda Mobility, a joint venture between Sony and Honda established in 2022, planned to sell vehicles directly to consumers, rather than through franchised dealers. In August 2025, after the company began taking reservations for the Afeela 1 sedan, the California New Car Dealers Association filed a lawsuit against Sony Honda Mobility and Honda on behalf of Honda and Acura dealers in the state, alleging that the company's plan for direct sales violated state law prohibiting automakers from competing with their franchised dealers by selling to customers directly. The company's planned vehicles were cancelled in 2026 before being delivered to any customers.

==== Scout Motors ====
Scout Motors is a wholly-owned subsidiary of Volkswagen Group launched in 2022 that plans to sell vehicles directly to consumers and service its vehicles itself, rather than sell through franchised dealers because of a reluctance among its dealers to sell EVs. The National Automobile Dealers Association filed a lawsuit against Volkswagen Group and Scout Motors on February 3, 2025, alleging that Scout's direct sales violate laws that prohibit automakers from competing with their franchised dealers. Volkswagen and Audi dealers in California and Florida similarly filed lawsuits, alleging Scout's direct sales model violates state franchise laws. Scout has asked the US Department of Justice to eliminate laws that prevent direct sales.

== Reception ==
=== Support ===
Critics of franchise laws view prohibitions of direct auto sales as thwarting legitimate competitive pressure that benefits consumers, and some have described them as "protectionism" and "crony capitalism". The Federal Trade Commission recommends allowing direct manufacturer sales, which a 2000 report by a Goldman Sachs analyst projected would save consumers an average of $2,225 on a $26,000 car. Economists have characterized laws that require independent dealers to sell cars as a form of rent-seeking that extracts rents from manufacturers of cars and increases costs for consumers of cars while raising profits for car dealers.

=== Opposition ===
In May 2014, a report prepared by Maryann Keller and Kenneth Elias for the National Automobile Dealers Association claimed that franchised dealers (such as offered by its members) offer better prices for customers through competition than direct sales, advocate for customers in warranty and recall disputes with manufacturers, and create jobs generate tax income that helps local economies.

== Laws per state regarding direct auto sales ==
| State | Direct sales exemption | Store limit |
|---|---|---|
| Alabama | No direct sales exemption | |
| Alaska | No specific prohibition of direct sales by manufacturers without franchise agreements | none |
| Arizona | Manufacturers without franchise agreements | none |
| Arkansas | No direct sales exemption | |
| California | Manufacturers without franchise agreements | none |
| Colorado | EV-only manufacturers without franchise agreements | none |
| Connecticut | No direct sales exemption, Mohegan Tribe allows Tesla direct sales | |
| Delaware | Manufacturers without franchise agreements | none |
| District of Columbia | No specific prohibition of direct auto sales, manufacturers must be licensed to sell by the Department of Motor Vehicles | none |
| Florida | Manufacturers without franchise agreements | none |
| Georgia | EV-only manufacturers without franchise agreements that began sales before 2015 (exempts Tesla only) | 5 stores |
| Hawaii | No specific prohibition of direct sales by manufacturers without franchise agreements | none |
| Idaho | No specific prohibition of direct sales by manufacturers without franchise agreements | none |
| Illinois | Manufacturers without franchise agreements | 13 stores |
| Indiana | Manufacturers without franchise agreements that began sales before July 1, 2015 (exempts Tesla only) | none |
| Iowa | No direct sales exemption | |
| Kansas | No direct sales exemption | |
| Kentucky | No direct sales exemption, the Kentucky Motor Vehicle Commission can grant sales licenses to manufacturers without franchises (Tesla is the only licensed manufacturer) | none |
| Louisiana | No direct sales exemption | |
| Maine | Manufacturers without franchise agreements | none |
| Maryland | EV-only manufacturers without franchise agreements | 4 stores |
| Massachusetts | Manufacturers without franchise agreements | none |
| Michigan | No direct sales exemption, Tesla allowed direct sales following a 2020 lawsuit but is not a licensed dealer and cannot title vehicles in-state | none |
| Minnesota | Manufacturers without franchise agreements | none |
| Mississippi | No direct sales exemption, grandfathers one Tesla store | 1 store |
| Missouri | Manufacturers without franchise agreements | none |
| Montana | No direct sales exemption | |
| Nebraska | No direct sales exemption | |
| Nevada | EV-only manufacturers without franchise agreements that began sales before 2016 (exempts Tesla only) | none |
| New Hampshire | Manufacturers without franchise agreements | none |
| New Jersey | EV-only manufacturers without franchise agreements that began sales before 2015 (exempts Tesla only) | 4 stores |
| New Mexico | No direct sales exemption, Nambé Pueblo and Santa Ana Pueblo tribal lands allow Tesla direct sales | |
| New York | EV-only manufacturers without franchise agreements that began sales before March 26, 2014 (exempts Tesla only), Oneida Indian Nation allows Tesla direct sales beyond state store limit | 5 stores |
| North Carolina | EV-only manufacturers without franchise agreements that began sales before 2019 (exempts Tesla only) | 6 stores |
| North Dakota | No direct sales exemption | |
| Ohio | Manufacturers without franchise agreements that began sales before 2014 (exempts Tesla only) | 3 stores |
| Oklahoma | No direct sales exemption | |
| Oregon | Manufacturers without franchise agreements | none |
| Pennsylvania | EV-only manufacturers without franchise agreements that began sales before 2014 (exempts Tesla only) | 5 stores |
| Rhode Island | Manufacturers without franchise agreements | none |
| South Carolina | No direct sales exemption | |
| South Dakota | No direct sales exemption | |
| Tennessee | Manufacturers without franchise agreements | none |
| Texas | No direct sales exemption | |
| Utah | EV-only manufacturers without franchise agreements | none |
| Vermont | Manufacturers without franchise agreements | none |
| Virginia | Manufacturers without franchise agreements | 5 stores |
| Washington | Manufacturers without franchise agreements that began sales before 2014 (exempts Tesla only) | none |
| West Virginia | No direct sales exemption | |
| Wisconsin | No direct sales exemption | |
| Wyoming | Manufacturers without franchise agreements | none |
