= Tesla US dealership disputes =

Dealership disputes Tesla has faced in the United States

Laws per state regarding Tesla direct sales Direct auto sales allowed for manufacturers without franchise agreements (Colorado, Maryland and Utah additionally specify EV-only manufacturers) Direct auto sales prohibited with an exemption for Tesla only Tesla has an agreement to sell on sovereign tribal land Direct auto sales prohibited for all manufacturers

Electric car manufacturer Tesla, Inc. has faced dealership disputes in several US states as a result of franchise laws. Unlike other automakers, Tesla does not rely on franchised auto dealerships to sell vehicles and instead directly sells vehicles through its website and a network of company-owned stores. All 50 states have laws that limit or ban manufacturers from selling vehicles directly to customers, with many states requiring that new cars be sold only by franchised dealers.

Tesla maintains that to properly explain to consumers the advantages its cars have over vehicles with an internal combustion engine, it cannot rely on third-party dealerships to handle its sales. Tesla has also argued it is not subject to franchise laws because it has never had franchised dealers. Economists have characterized laws that require independent dealers to sell cars as a form of rent-seeking that extracts rents from manufacturers of cars and increases costs for consumers of cars while raising profits for car dealers.

== Corporate strategy ==
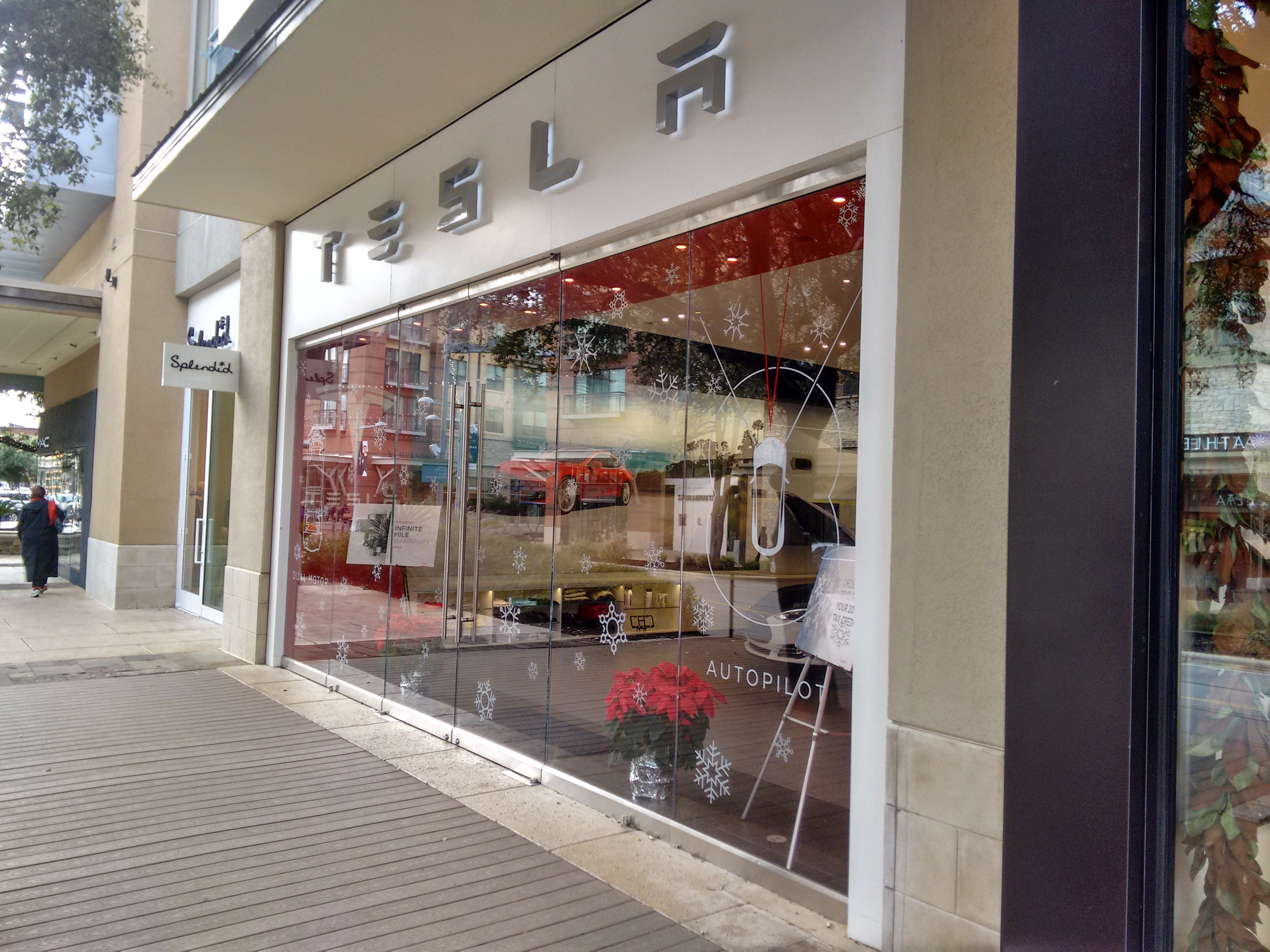
A Tesla gallery in Austin, Texas

Tesla has a 60% degree of vertical integration in 2016, according to Goldman Sachs. The integration includes its own sales channels and proprietary charging infrastructure, among others. The high degree is rare in the automotive industry, where companies typically focus on engine manufacturing and vehicle assembly, outsourcing 80% of components to suppliers while letting franchises serve as sales points.

Some of Tesla's stated goals are to increase the number and variety of electric vehicles (EVs) available to mainstream consumers by selling its own vehicles in company-owned showrooms and online. Tesla states that owning stores "creates an information loop from our customers straight into manufacturing and vehicle design". Tesla attempts to not make a profit on servicing cars.

=== Sales model ===
As of September 2020, Tesla operates more than 130 stores and galleries in the United States, and has stores and galleries in 34 other countries. It sells vehicles through its owned showrooms and the internet.

Tesla has a low budget for marketing, and uses a referral program and word of mouth to attract buyers.

== US dealerships and automotive dealership disputes ==
As of September 2020, Tesla has stores and galleries where customers can buy vehicles, as well as from the Tesla website. The stores serve as showrooms that allow people to learn about the company and its vehicles. Some galleries are located in states with restrictive dealership protection laws which prevent discussing price, financing, and test drives, as well as other restrictions. In 2016, Tesla set up mobile-shipping-container "stores" and six Airstream travel trailers each pulled by a Model X, reaching areas not served by brick-and-mortar shops.

Tesla's strategy of direct customer sales and company-owned stores and service centers is different from the dealership model used by other manufacturers in the US vehicle marketplace. In the early 2010s, Tesla was the only manufacturer that sold cars directly to customers; all other automakers used independently owned franchised dealerships although some automakers provided online configuration and financing. Tesla maintains it cannot rely on third-party dealerships to handle its sales because dealerships do not properly explain the advantages its cars have over vehicles with an internal combustion engine. Tesla CEO Elon Musk said selling its vehicles through dealer networks would create a conflict of interest because they counter-sell the gasoline vehicles that make up the bulk of dealerships' sales and service income.

All 50 states and DC have laws that limit or ban manufacturers from selling vehicles directly to consumers, and although Tesla has no independent dealerships, dealership associations in multiple states have filed lawsuits against Tesla to prevent the company from selling cars. Among other states, North Carolina and New Hampshire sided with Tesla, while Virginia and Texas sided with dealers. Jurisdictions outside the United States do not have such laws protecting car dealerships.

Laws prohibiting direct auto sales arose in the United States in the 1930s, when manufacturers started using independently franchised dealerships to offload the tasks of selling and servicing vehicles. The laws have been actively defended into the 21st century and extend to online in-state sales. Such regulations protect dealerships from manufacturers opening their own dealerships and competing against resellers, which could be seen as an abuse of the manufacturer-franchise relationship. Critics view the laws as thwarting legitimate competitive pressure that benefits consumers, and some have described them as "protectionism", and "crony capitalism".

The Federal Trade Commission recommends allowing direct manufacturer sales, which a 2000 report by a Goldman Sachs analyst projected would save consumers an average of $2,225 on a $26,000 car. In May 2014, a report prepared by Maryann Keller and Kenneth Elias for the National Automobile Dealers Association claimed that franchises (such as offered by its members) offer better value for customers than direct sales.

Independent dealerships typically earn more money from service than from sales, so the lower maintenance requirements of electric vehicles can provide a financial incentive for selling gas-powered vehicles, to Tesla's disadvantage. Investigations by Consumer Reports and the Sierra Club found that independent dealers often could not answer questions about electric cars, did not provide information about government rebates, did not showcase the cars prominently, or let the batteries run out.

== States with total direct sales bans ==
=== Alabama (also bans service centers) ===
Alabama regards manufacturer-owned new motor vehicle stores and service centers as "unfair and deceptive trade practices". In August 2016, State Senator Tom Whatley introduced Senate Bill 22, assigned to the Senate Tourism and Marketing Committee, which would allow a manufacturer of alternative fuel vehicles to sell and lease its vehicles directly to the public. The bill died in committee. In August 2025, Tesla opened a service center in Birmingham. In July 2026, Tesla opened a store on the tribal lands of Poarch Band of Creek Indians in Wetumpka, a strategy they have employed in Connecticut and New Mexico.

=== Arkansas ===
Arkansas law prohibits manufacturers from owning dealerships. In April 2021, Governor Asa Hutchinson signed HB1922, which amended the existing franchise law to explicitly prohibit direct leasing.

=== Connecticut (allows direct leasing) ===
Connecticut does not allow manufacturer direct sales, but does allow direct leasing. Tesla operated a gallery in Greenwich that the Connecticut Automotive Retailers Association shut down via a lawsuit. In March 2018, Tesla appealed the ruling to operate the Greenwich gallery as an unlicensed dealership, but later dropped the appeal. The gallery was shut down in March 2019. In December 2019, Tesla started offering leases at their showrooms which allowed them to provide test drives for customers discussing leases.

In 2015, 2016, 2017, and 2018, bills were introduced in the legislature to allow licensing electric vehicle manufacturers as dealers.

In March 2021, Connecticut state bill SB-127 (the EV Freedom Bill), that would allow all EV makers to sell directly to their customers, passed out of the General Assembly's Transportation Committee and awaited a vote by the full state house and senate. The Session Year 2022 bill was Senate Bill number 214. The bill was reported on favorably by the Transportation Committee on March 14, 2022 by a vote with 21 yeas to 14 nays, but never received a floor vote.

Tesla opened a store at the Mohegan Sun casino in late 2023, utilizing a similar tribal land loophole as in New Mexico.

=== Iowa ===
Iowa law currently prohibits manufacturers from owning dealerships.

=== Kansas (also bans galleries) ===
Kansas does not allow the sale of vehicles directly or indirectly without a franchise agreement with the manufacturer. This includes the display of vehicles in a showroom, thus banning galleries. Kansas does permit service centers, and one is planned for Lenexa. The city council granted its approval on April 19, 2022.

=== Louisiana ===
Louisiana enacted a law in June 2017 that bans direct-to-consumer vehicle sales. Louisiana permits service centers, with one in New Orleans. However, that service center may not be able to perform warranty repairs after Tesla had a lawsuit against Louisiana thrown out of federal court.

=== Nebraska ===
Nebraska law prohibits auto manufacturer direct sales. In 2018, LB830 was introduced to change the law. In 2020, LB51 was introduced, also to this effect, but did not pass.

Tesla opened a service center in Lincoln in 2023, but LB891, introduced by Carolyn Bosn, would force it to close if passed in its original form. Negotiations are underway for a compromise amendment that would allow the service center to remain open even under LB891.

=== New Mexico (also bans service centers) ===
2006 New Mexico Statutes, Section 57-16-5-V prohibits manufacturers like Tesla from being licensed as a dealer and directly or indirectly performing warranty or other services. Despite Tesla owners' pleas to change the law, they still currently depend on Tesla facilities that are either on tribal land or out-of-state for Tesla sales and services.

In January 2019, the Public Affairs Committee approved the Tesla-friendly Senate Bill 243, but it died on the Senate Corporations and Transportation Committee calendar. House Bill 294 died in the House Commerce and Economic Development Committee.

In August 2021, Tesla opened their first store and service center in the state on Nambé Pueblo tribal land north of Santa Fe. Prior to this, Tesla owners in New Mexico were heavily reliant on mobile service. A second store and service center north of Albuquerque on Santa Ana Pueblo tribal land opened on June 1, 2023.

=== North Dakota ===
In November 2025, after Tesla's applications for dealership licenses in Fargo and Bismarck were denied, Tesla sued North Dakota's Department of Transportation. North Dakota law only allows manufacturers to sell vehicles directly in temporary situations when no independent dealers are available.

=== Oklahoma ===
Oklahoma bans direct sales by auto manufacturers. Legislation was introduced in February 2018 to allow it, but it failed. State Representative Mike Dobrinski, a former automotive dealer himself, has made multiple attempts to expand this ban to include service centers, eventually resulting in HB2244 passing the Oklahoma House of Representatives on March 21, 2023. However, HB2244 did not receive a floor vote in the Oklahoma Senate. Tesla has two facilities that would have been affected had this bill become law: one in Oklahoma City, the other in Tulsa. Dobrinski introduced three bills in the 2024 Oklahoma legislative session: HB3105, HB3104 and SB2022.

=== South Carolina (also bans service centers) ===
South Carolina bans manufacturer ownership of new car dealerships and manufacturer service/repair of cars they do not own. A bill was introduced in 2019 to allow electric-only manufacturers to sell in the state. However, Tesla offers mobile service in the state. Tesla opened a service center in Columbia in 2025. They got around the ban on service centers by leasing the building from a third party.

=== Texas ===
Texas law prohibits direct-to-consumer auto sales. Texas residents can purchase a car from Tesla's website, but it is handled as an out-of-state transaction and must be completed before the vehicle ships to Texas. Tesla recently added the ability to include tax, title, license, and registration in the sale price of the car so the purchaser does not have to pay that separately once they receive the vehicle. In 2015, Tesla lobbied the Texas Legislature to modify the law to allow Tesla to sell directly to consumers, and specifically allow Tesla employees to discuss "financing, leasing, or purchasing options" at the firm's existing galleries in Austin, Dallas, and Houston. Texas considered legislation in 2015 to allow Tesla to operate in the state but legislation was not passed.

As of 2016, most of the GOP delegates support direct sales while Governor Greg Abbott prefers the current system. According to Texans for Public Justice, Tesla spent $1.3 million on lobbyists, while dealerships spent $1 million.

=== West Virginia (also bans galleries) ===
West Virginia does not allow Tesla-owned stores or showrooms. In January 2019, House Bill 2219 was introduced that would allow a manufacturer to be licensed and operate as a new motor vehicle dealer if the company only sells zero-emissions vehicles and has been manufacturing since 2008.

=== Wisconsin ===
Auto manufacturers are not allowed to sell directly to the public under Wisconsin law. In late 2017, a legislative bill named the "Electric Vehicle Freedom Act" was introduced to allow only electric vehicle manufactures to sell directly. The bill is opposed by the Wisconsin Automobile Dealers & Truck Association. In 2018, bill AB 717/SB 605 did not make it out of the legislature. In January 2025, Tesla filed a lawsuit in the Milwaukee County Circuit Court for permission to open four dealerships.

== States with limited sales ==
=== Kentucky (2024 licensor determination) ===
Kentucky does not generally allow direct sales by auto manufacturers. In 2024, Tesla was granted a single license for its Louisville location. Tesla opened its first store in Middletown in August 2025, with a gallery planned for Lexington, and has numerous charging stations.

=== Mississippi (1 store limit) ===
On March 14, 2023, Governor Tate Reeves of Mississippi signed HB401, which bans direct sales of EVs by manufacturers. Tesla's existing Brandon location will be "grandfathered in".

=== Ohio (3 store limit) ===
In December 2013, days before Tesla was to open its first store in Ohio, a one line amendment to a draft bill was proposed at the urging of the Ohio Automobile Dealers Association that would have prevented Tesla from selling directly to the public in the state. This amendment was dropped a day later. A group of auto dealers then sued the state to try to get Tesla's license rescinded. This suit was dismissed less than two months later. Shortly thereafter a legislative bill was introduced that would ban all manufacturers from owning dealerships, not just those with existing franchisees. A deal reached between Tesla and the Ohio Automobile Dealers Association in March 2014 allowed Tesla to have three stores but blocks all other auto manufacturers. The Ohio Senate approved the bill in April.

=== Maryland (4 store limit) ===
In May 2015, Maryland approved, through House Bill 235, direct Tesla sales to customers beginning in October 2015, though limiting the statewide number of stores to only four. The legislation was crafted specifically for Tesla and allows only four manufacturers of electric or non-fossil fuel burning vehicles without existing franchisees to be licensed to sell direct to the public.

=== Virginia (5 store limit) ===
In Virginia, Tesla has obtained license from the Department of Motor Vehicles (DMV) for a single direct sales dealership (Tysons Corner). Upon learning of Tesla's attempt to obtain a second dealership in the state, the Virginia Automobile Dealers Association filed a lawsuit in March 2016 against both Tesla and the DMV to prevent the licensing of the second dealership. In September 2016, the Virginia Department of Motor Vehicles (VDMV) recommended ending Tesla direct sales, as at least 11 dealerships were interested in selling Tesla vehicles. The VDMV later allowed Tesla to open another store (Richmond), as Tesla has no dealerships to compete against; the 11 interested dealerships would not be able to compete on undiscounted prices, as Tesla has the same price online and in stores. Third-party profits could come from servicing as is traditional, but Tesla already offers servicing. In July 2021, Tesla won approval from the Virginia Department of Motor Vehicles to open three new stores in Charlottesville, Norfolk and Arlington.

=== New Jersey (4 store limit) ===
Tesla opened it first two stores in New Jersey in late 2012 after being issued two dealership licenses.

On March 10, 2014, it was announced that New Jersey Motor Vehicle Commission and Governor Chris Christie's administration would be holding a meeting to pass a new proposal into law. This new proposal, PRN 2013–138, was announced one day before it was to be put into law. Tesla responded by saying that the proposal "seeks to impose stringent licensing rules that would, among other things, require all new motor vehicles to be sold through middlemen and block Tesla's direct sales model", and that "[Governor Christie's] Administration has decided to go outside the legislative process by expediting a rule proposal that would completely change the law in New Jersey." The law was passed, and "Tesla will no longer [be able to] sell electric cars in New Jersey, effective April 1". Diarmuid O'Connell, Tesla Vice President of Business Development, said, "Worse, it has done so without any reasonable notice or even a public hearing." Forbes contributor Mark Rogosky said, "The state's new rules protect its auto dealers from having to compete with Tesla's direct sales model"; he points out that this is a direct contrast from what Christie said earlier, "We are for a free-market society that allows your effort and ingenuity to determine your success, not the cold, hard hand of the government." Kevin Roberts, a spokesman for the Christie administration, responded by saying "it was the [Tesla Motors] company, not the governor's office, that was attempting to bypass normal procedures.".

In March 2015, a bill was signed creating an exemption for Tesla that allowed zero-emission vehicle manufacturers that began selling before 2014 to sell at up to four locations and requiring a minimum of one service center.

2018 session Senate bill No. 3493 was introduced to increase the number of allowed sales locations to 14 by 2023, but increases the mandated retail service facilities to seven. It died in committee.

In September 2019, the New Jersey auto dealers' association, the New Jersey Coalition of Automotive Retailers, sued Tesla and the state to stop Tesla from selling cars by its current methods in the state.

In October 2026, a bill was introduced in the Senate by Senate President Nick Scutari to force EV makers to use third-party franchised dealerships and outlaw galleries: "New Jersey Franchised Automobile Industry Retail (FAIR) Sales Act".

=== Pennsylvania (5 store limit) ===
Pennsylvania enacted a law in 2014 that allows Tesla to open up to five stores.

=== New York (5 store limit) ===
In 2014, New York banned direct sales but grandfathered in five Tesla stores. Tesla operates four galleries in addition to its five stores. There was proposed legislation in 2018 (Senate bill S6600A and Assembly bill A8248A) to allow more stores. The Eastern New York Coalition of Automotive Retailers opposed this as did the Rochester Automobile Dealers Association.

Tesla has plans to open a new store in Canastota, New York, by utilizing a tribal land loophole with the Oneida Indian Nation, similarly to how it enabled opening two Tesla locations in New Mexico.

In April 2025, in response to Tesla CEO Elon Musk's participation in the government of President Donald Trump, several Democratic Party state legislative members sponsored a bill to take away Tesla's New York dealership license.

=== North Carolina (6 store limit) ===
Tesla's first store in North Carolina was in Raleigh. In 2016 the state would not grant Tesla a dealer license for a second location in Charlotte. A previous legislative bill that would allow six Tesla stores was shelved in 2017. In July 2019, a bill was passed allowing Tesla to operate a maximum of six stores, unlimited galleries and repair centers.

=== Georgia (5 store limit) ===
In 2015, Georgia Governor Nathan Deal signed a bill that allows Tesla to sell directly in the state and operate up to five stores. The provision allows direct sales for EV-only manufacturers without franchises that began sales in the state prior to 2015.

=== Illinois (13 store limit) ===
In 2019, the Illinois Secretary of State, the Illinois Automobile Dealers Association, and Tesla entered into an administrative consent order stating that Tesla could have up to thirteen dealer licenses in Illinois.

== States for which Tesla gained the right to mostly unrestricted direct sales ==
=== New Hampshire (2013 law change) ===
In 2013, New Hampshire passed legislation to allow auto manufacturers with no existing franchise dealer in the state to engage in direct sales. The first store in New Hampshire opened in 2025 in Londonderry.

=== Minnesota (2013 law interpretation) ===
The Minnesota Department of Public Safety ruled in 2013 that the original dealer law "does not prohibit a manufacturer from becoming licensed as a dealer in Minnesota". The dealership association in the state failed in their attempt to get the law changed to block Tesla.

=== Washington (2014 law) ===
A 2014 Washington state law outlawed direct sales but grandfathered in Tesla.

=== Massachusetts (2014 court ruling) ===
After an almost two year court battle with the Massachusetts State Automobile Dealers Association, a September 2014 ruling by the Massachusetts Supreme Judicial Court allowed Tesla to begin selling directly in the state. The court ruled the law only protected franchise dealers from abuse by manufacturers they already buy from; since no franchise dealers were selling Tesla vehicles at the time of the suit, the court ruled the association had no standing to sue.

=== Nevada (2014 law) ===
In 2014, Nevada Governor Brian Sandoval approved a measure that allowed Tesla to sell vehicles directly in the state after Tesla agreed to open a battery factory near Reno. Nevada law allows auto manufacturers without franchises to sell directly if they began selling in the state before January 1, 2016.

=== Missouri (2017 court ruling) ===
A Missouri circuit court ruled in August 2016 to end direct sales, confirmed in late December 2016, and delayed in early January while the Missouri Department of Revenue appeals the former verdict. In December 2017 an appeals court reversed the circuit court's decision, saying the Missouri Automobile Dealers Association did not have standing to sue. However, the association is backing new legislation that would allow it to sue.

=== Wyoming (2017 law change) ===
Wyoming banned direct sales until a law change in 2017 that created a direct sale manufacturer's license. Electric cars were seen as a way to promote the use of coal mined in the state.

=== Arizona (2017 court ruling) ===
Arizona blocked direct sales until June 2017 when an administrative law judge ruled that the Arizona Department of Transportation interpreted the law incorrectly and the state's ban on direct auto sales only applied to manufacturers with franchised dealers. This was after a years-long legal battle by Tesla.

=== Indiana (2017 law change) ===
Indiana allows a service center and manufacturer sales for 30 months, ending direct Tesla sales by the end of 2017. A legislative proposal had further restrictions, opposed by Tesla. The Roads and Transportation committee approved a modification that grandfathered Tesla, but maintained the ban on all new direct sales by other automakers.

=== Rhode Island (2017 law interpretation) ===
In December 2017, Tesla was granted a license by the state of Rhode Island after DMV lawyers concluded that the law blocking direct auto sales only applied to manufacturers that have franchised dealers. Tesla began direct sales in 2019 in Warwick.

=== Utah (2018 law change) ===
On March 21, 2018, Utah Governor Gary Herbert signed a bill into law allowing direct sales of non-fossil fuel vehicles in the state for manufacturers that do not have existing franchises.

=== Michigan (2020 legal settlement) ===
After a change of political leadership in Michigan's executive branch, on January 22, 2020, Tesla and the state of Michigan agreed to settle Tesla's 2016 federal lawsuit against the state for unfair vehicle sales and service restrictions. The agreement allows Tesla to sell and service cars within the state. Previously Tesla could not sell or service vehicles in Michigan. Tesla may deliver vehicles within the state, but they must be titled outside of Michigan and transferred to a new title after purchase. Tesla may not own a service center directly, but a wholly owned subsidiary may own a service center.

=== Colorado (2020 law change) ===
In March 2020, the law was changed (via Senate Bill 20–167) to allow EV-only manufacturers to sell directly in Colorado. Tesla had previously been restricted to a single store for ten years. A 2010 revision to the state dealership law removed the word "franchised", which closed the loophole that Tesla had used to open a store. The existing single store at the time had been "grandfathered in". As of April 2023, Tesla has 6 stores in Colorado.

=== Delaware (2023 court ruling) ===
In May 2023, the Delaware Supreme Court overturned a lower court ruling which had banned Tesla from establishing sales locations in Delaware, rejecting claims that the state's franchise law prohibited the direct sales model.

=== Florida (2023 law change) ===
In June 2023, House Bill 637 was signed, which establishes a "franchise law" in Florida, but creates an exception for manufacturers without existing franchise agreements.

== See also ==
- Direct-to-consumer automobile selling in the United States
