= Grand Theft Auto (disambiguation) =

Grand Theft Auto is a video game series developed by Rockstar Games.

Grand Theft Auto may also refer to:

== Video games ==
- Grand Theft Auto (video game), the 1997 first video game in the series
- Grand Theft Auto Advance, also known simply as Grand Theft Auto, 2004
- Grand Theft Auto clone, a subgenre of open world action-adventure video games
- "Grand Theft Auto", a title in the 1981 video game Thief (arcade game)

== Books ==
- Grand Theft Auto, the seventh part of the 2003 sixth chapter of the Tokyopop edition of the manga Lupin III
- Grand Theft Auto, a 2011 book by Alison Spitzer and Alan Spitzer

== Music ==
=== Albums ===
- Grand Theft Auto - G-Unit City (G-Unit Radio Part 9), by G-Unit, 2004
- Grand Theft Auto 6, by Rico Recklezz, 2017

=== Songs ===
- "Grand Theft Auto", by Christophe Beck and Jake Monaco from Tower Heist, 2011
- "Grand Theft Auto (Intro)", by Kausion from South Central Los Skanless, 1995
- "Grand Theft Auto", by The Walkabouts from New West Motel, 1993
- "Grand Theft Auto", by Drumsound & Bassline Smith, 2002
- "Grand Theft Auto", by Geeneus, 2005
- "Grand Theft Auto", by JID featuring Mereba, 2013
- "Grand Theft Auto", by Promatic featuring Kuniva and Proof, 2008
- "Grand Theft Auto", by Roy Blair, produced by Instupendo, 2017
- "Grand Theft Auto", by Soldier Kidd, co-produced by KidTerror and Vybe Beatz, 2017

== Film, television, and other audiovisual media ==
- Grand Theft Auto (film), a 1977 film directed by Ron Howard
- Grand Theft Auto: Give Me Liberty, a 2014 television film starring JR Bourne and Max Carver
- Episodes of Cops
  - "Grand Theft Auto 1 Special Edition", a 2002 episode, season 15, episode 4
  - "Grand Theft Auto 2 Special Edition", a 2004 episode, season 17, episode 8
  - "Grand Theft Auto 3 Special Edition", a 2005 episode, season 17, episode 29
- "Grand Theft Auto", a 2012 episode of Drugs, Inc., season 2, episode 8
- "Grand Theft Auto", a 1984 episode of T. J. Hooker, season 4, episode 10
- "Grand Theft Auto", a 2013 episode of Baggage Battles, season 2, episode 9
- "Grand Theft Auto for Intellivision", a digital short from "1UP", a 2008 sketch show by Mostly Water Theatre
- "Grand Theft Auto V: Dumb Ways to Die", a parody of the media franchise Dumb Ways to Die

== See also ==
- Motor vehicle theft, a crime in virtually all jurisdictions of the world, called "grand theft auto" chiefly in the United States, and after which the video game series Grand Theft Auto is named
