= Fitzgerald Auto Mall =

Auto dealership group on the east coast of the US

Coordinates: 39.0438°N 77.1106°W

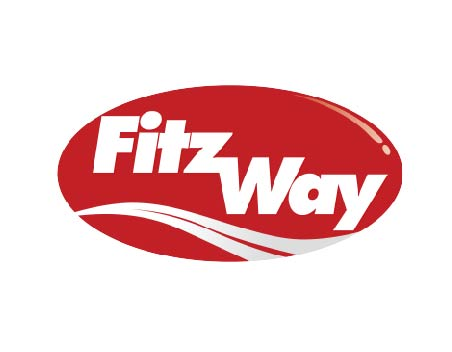
- Type: Private
- Industry: Automotive
- Founded: 1966
- Founder: Jack Fitzgerald
- Headquarters: Rockville, Maryland, U.S.
- Number of locations: 14 in 3 states
- Key people: Rob Smith, President/Trustee
- Services: Sales, service and parts
- Number of employees: ~1,700 (2021)
- Website: www.fitzmall.com

Fitzgerald Auto Mall is a family owned and operated auto dealership with locations in Maryland, Pennsylvania and Florida. As of 2026, the company ranked number 100 on the list of "Top 150 Dealership Groups" in the U.S., which is published annually by Automotive News.

== History ==
In 1966, Fitzgerald Auto Mall was founded with a Colonial Dodge (now a Fitzgerald Hyundai-Genesis-Subaru) dealership in Rockville, Maryland. Fitzgerald has used no-haggle pricing since 1979. It currently encompasses 14 dealerships across Maryland, Pennsylvania and Florida that sell 15 different brands.

In 2003, Fitzgerald Auto Mall became the first automotive dealership group to have achieved ISO 9001 and ISO 14001 certifications. Since 2003, Fitzgerald Auto Mall remains the only car dealer group in North America to have achieved ISO 9001 and ISO 14001 certifications.

In 2005, Fitzgerald Auto Mall was one of the three companies to receive the National Capital Business Ethics Award at an awards dinner held at the Ritz Carlton in Tysons Corner, Virginia. In addition to Fitzgerald, the award was given to National Security Research, Inc. and Ventera Corporation. More than 50 companies from the Washington D.C. area were nominated in 2005 for this award.

In May 2006, Fitzgerald agreed with Pepco Energy Services to switch all of its Maryland dealerships from electricity generated via conventional power sources to wind power.

In 2008, Fitzgerald Auto Mall was selected as one of only six car dealers in the U.S. to offer plug-in hybrid conversion systems for the Toyota Prius.

In 2023 Fitzgerald Auto Malls became the largest Employee Owned dealership group when Jack Fitzgerald founded the Fitzgerald ESOP Trust.

=== Recognition/Awards ===
- In 2001, Fitzgerald Auto Mall' CEO, Jack Fitzgerald, was named the Auto E-tailer of the Year by the American International Automobile Dealers Association for his success in electronic commerce.
- On February 1, 2004, Fitzgerald Auto Mall was presented with an International Organization for Standardization (ISO) registration certificate at the National Automobile Dealers Association Convention in Las Vegas. This was the first ever ISO 9001 registration of a multi-location dealer group in auto retail history. Fitzgerald has also been awarded an ISO 14001 certification for its Environmental Management System.
- On October 20, 2005, Fitzgerald Auto Mall won the large-company award, for companies with 250 or more employees, at the 2005 National Capital Business Ethics Award dinner at the Ritz-Carlton Hotel in Tysons Corner, Virginia. Over 50 companies were nominated.
- In 2006, Fitzgerald Auto Mall recycled over 2 million pounds of waste in Montgomery County - 80% of the waste they generated. For this, Fitzgerald was awarded the Outstanding Achievement in Recycling Award from the county.
- In 2009, Fitzgerald Auto Mall was awarded LEED Gold Certification by the U.S. Green Building Council for its Germantown, Maryland dealership location. This dealership features on site Solar Trees, which help power the building in addition to wind power. Fitzgerald was the first LEED Gold dealership east of the Mississippi.
- In November 2013, Fitzgerald Toyota participated in the Toyota 100 Cars for Good program. This is a philanthropic initiative in which Toyota gave away 100 cars to 100 nonprofits over the course of 100 days, based on votes from the public.
- On the morning of May 15, 2014, Fitzgerald Auto Mall installed the 45,000th child safety seat at one of Fitzgerald's automobile dealerships.
- Fitzgerald Auto Mall is a member of the Clean Energy Partnership in Maryland and its facilities are now run by power generated entirely from wind turbines. Fitzgerald is also credited with being the first auto dealer to become a U.S. EPA Green Power partner.
- Fitzgerald Auto Mall' CEO, Jack Fitzgerald, is a recipient of the Golden Gear Award, the All Star Dealer Award, and the USA Today and NADA Innovative Dealer Award.
- Jack Fitzgerald named a Visionary Dealer by Automotive News 2022.

== 2008-2010 Automotive industry crisis ==
In the latter half of 2008, a global-scale recession adversely impacted the economy of the United States. A limited availability of credit and declining automobile sales led to a more widespread crisis in the United States auto industry. In 2009, GM and Chrysler announced that they were closing 2,200 dealers, affecting 170,000 jobs nationwide. Fitzgerald Auto Mall was scheduled to have all five of its Chrysler dealerships eliminated.

In 2009, CEO Jack Fitzgerald, alongside fellow dealers Tammy Darvish and Alan Spitzer, formed an advocacy group, the Committee to Restore Dealer Rights (CRDR), to fight against the elimination of dealer franchises across the nation by GM and Chrysler. CRDR's main goal was to ensure the passage of the Automobile Dealer Economic Rights Restoration Act of 2009.

== Community Outreach ==
In February 1999, Fitzgerald Auto Mall partnered with Safe Kids USA in Maryland to hold a car seat check-up event. The dealership hosts free monthly car seat inspections the third Thursday of each month from March through December that anyone in the community may attend without an appointment. If the monthly events are not compatible with a family's schedule, Fitzgerald offers private appointments. There is an additional inspection day dedicated solely to Spanish-speaking families. Working with county and state agencies, Fitzgerald has inspected more than 45,000 child safety seats since the program began in 1999.

Fitzgerald hosts pet adoption events to find homes for local pets in need. Fitzgerald works with the Washington Animal Rescue League (WARL) for various animal adoption events. Fitzgerald Auto Mall has provided its dealerships to house these local adoption events, including its North Bethesda, Frederick, and Rockville locations.

Fitzgerald helps to sponsor and participate in a local, corporate work-study program in Maryland. The students in this program each work one day a week with a local business, agency, or other employer to gain experience as well as help cover the tuition of private Catholic college preparatory school. Fitzgerald is one of more than 75 partners in this work-study program, including the Montgomery County government, Holy Cross Hospital and NASA.
