= Automobile Dealer Economic Rights Restoration Act =

2009 USA economic legislation act

- Long title: An Act to restore the economic rights of automobile dealers, and for other purposes.
- Acronyms (colloquial): ADERRA
- Enacted by: the 111th United States Congress

Legislative history
- Introduced in the House as H.R. 2743 by Rep. Dan Maffei (D–NY) with Rep. Frank Kratovil (D–MD) on June 8, 2009; Committee consideration by House Committee on Financial Services; Senate Judiciary; Passed the House on 2009; Passed the Senate on 2009; Signed into law by President Barack Obama on December 18, 2009

The Automobile Dealer Economic Rights Restoration Act (ADERRA), House Bill HR2743 and Senate Bill S1304, were introduced in the 111th United States Congress to restore the economic rights of car dealers.

Congressman Frank Kratovil (D-MD) and Congressman Dan Maffei (D-NY) introduced H.R.2743 with Majority Leader Steny Hoyer (D-MD).

== Background ==
Pursuant to their loan agreement with the U.S. Treasury and as a condition of receiving additional TARP funding, General Motors and Chrysler corporations announced the closure of automobile dealerships in June 2009, and instructed dealerships to either close in 26 days (Chrysler) or participate in a "wind down" agreement until October 2010 (GM) at which time franchise agreements would not be renewed.

== Behind the legislation ==
Legislation was drafted using Arent Fox bankruptcy attorneys in Washington, DC. Dealers created a small committee including Spitzer Automotive Family, DARCARS Automotive Family and Fitzgerald Automotive Family. The National Automobile Dealers Association (NADA) also supported the legislation, as well as National Association of Minority Auto Dealers (NAMAD).

== Congressional hearings ==
Hearings were held by Senator Jay Rockefeller (D-WV) during which the Senator questions the criteria of selection, time allowed and the validity of the reasons for closure. As a result of the hearing, a group of automobile dealers worked with Congressional representatives to draft legislation that would allow franchises to be reinstated at the dealer's request, but at the same time would not prevent the sale of assets in the US Bankruptcy court, or the merger of Chrysler with Fia (SPA).

As the Congress came to a close, members of the Committee to Restore Dealer Rights (CRDR) met with members of the Auto Task Force who aided in Senator Durbin being assigned to handle a potentially non-legislative solution in the Senate, along with majority Leader Hoyer in the House of Representatives. Negotiations were terminated by the manufacturers who announced a unilateral process that was not acceptable to members of Congress.

== Passage ==
At the 11th hour, HR3288 sec.747 was adopted in a conference committee and signed into law by President Barack Obama on December 18, 2009 providing the opportunity for dealers who were closed to seek arbitration.

The office of the Inspector General released a report and stated on page 33 that the options presented by the Auto Task Force about closing dealers were a "false dilemma with no factual support."

== See also ==
- National Association of Minority Auto Dealers
- National Automobile Dealers Association
