= Sony Honda Mobility =

Japanese automotive joint venture company

Sony Honda Mobility Inc.
- Native name: ソニー・ホンダモビリティ株式会社
- Romanized name: Sonī Hondamobiriti Kabushikigaisha
- Type: Joint venture
- Industry: Automotive
- Founded: 13 October 2022; 4 years ago
- Headquarters: Tokyo Midtown East, 9-7-2, Akasaka, Minato, Tokyo, Japan
- Area served: Worldwide
- Key people: Yasuhide Mizuno (Representative Director, chairman and CEO); Izumi Kawanishi (Representative Director, president and COO)
- Products: Automobiles
- Brands: Afeela
- Owners: Sony Group Corporation; Honda Motor Co., Ltd.
- Website: www.shm-afeela.com

Sony Honda Mobility Inc. (Japanese: ソニー・ホンダモビリティ株式会社, Hepburn: Sonī Hondamobiriti Kabushikigaisha) is a Japanese joint venture automotive company established by Sony Group Corporation and Honda Motor Company in 2022 to produce battery electric vehicles. The company markets its vehicles under the Afeela (Japanese: アフィーラ, Hepburn: Afīra) brand.

== History ==
In January 2020, Sony revealed its first electric sedan prototype, the Sony Vision-S, at CES 2020. According to the company, the Vision-S incorporates Sony's imaging and sensing technologies. In contrast, Sony's artificial intelligence, telecommunication, and cloud computing technologies enable the continued updating and evolution of the vehicle's features. A second concept car, an electric SUV was unveiled in January 2022 at the CES 2022 as the Vision-S 02, while the original concept was retroactively renamed to Vision-S 01.

In April 2022, Sony established Sony Mobility Inc. as their mobility service arm. In March 2022, Sony and Honda signed a memorandum of understanding to deepen the discussion and exploration of forming a strategic alliance between the two companies. In June 2022, while still in the process of negotiating the details of the partnership, both companies announced that their joint venture company would be called "Sony Honda Mobility Inc." The company was led by Yasuhide Mizuno, who served as the head of Honda's China division until 2020. The company was officially announced through a press conference on October 13, 2022. According to the company, it aims to become a software-oriented "Mobility Tech Company".

In January 2023, the company revealed its first electric vehicle prototype under the brand name Afeela at CES 2023. The prototype was a four-door sedan that was planned to be produced in the U.S. in 2026. In January 2025, the company revealed the production version of the prototype, called the Afeela 1, at CES 2025. The company revealed Prototype 2026, an electric SUV concept at CES 2026.

On March 25, 2026, the company announced that it was cancelling production of the Afeela 1 and Afeela SUV prototype. On April 21, 2026, the company announced it would be restructuring, with nearly all employees reassigned to parent companies Sony and Honda.

== Dealership disputes ==
Sony Honda Mobility planned to sell vehicles directly to consumers rather than through franchised dealers. In August 2025, the California New Car Dealers Association filed a lawsuit against Sony Honda Mobility and Honda on behalf of Honda and Acura dealers in the state, alleging that the company's plan for direct sales violates state law prohibiting automakers from competing with their franchised dealers by selling to customers directly.

== Models ==
=== Afeela 1 ===
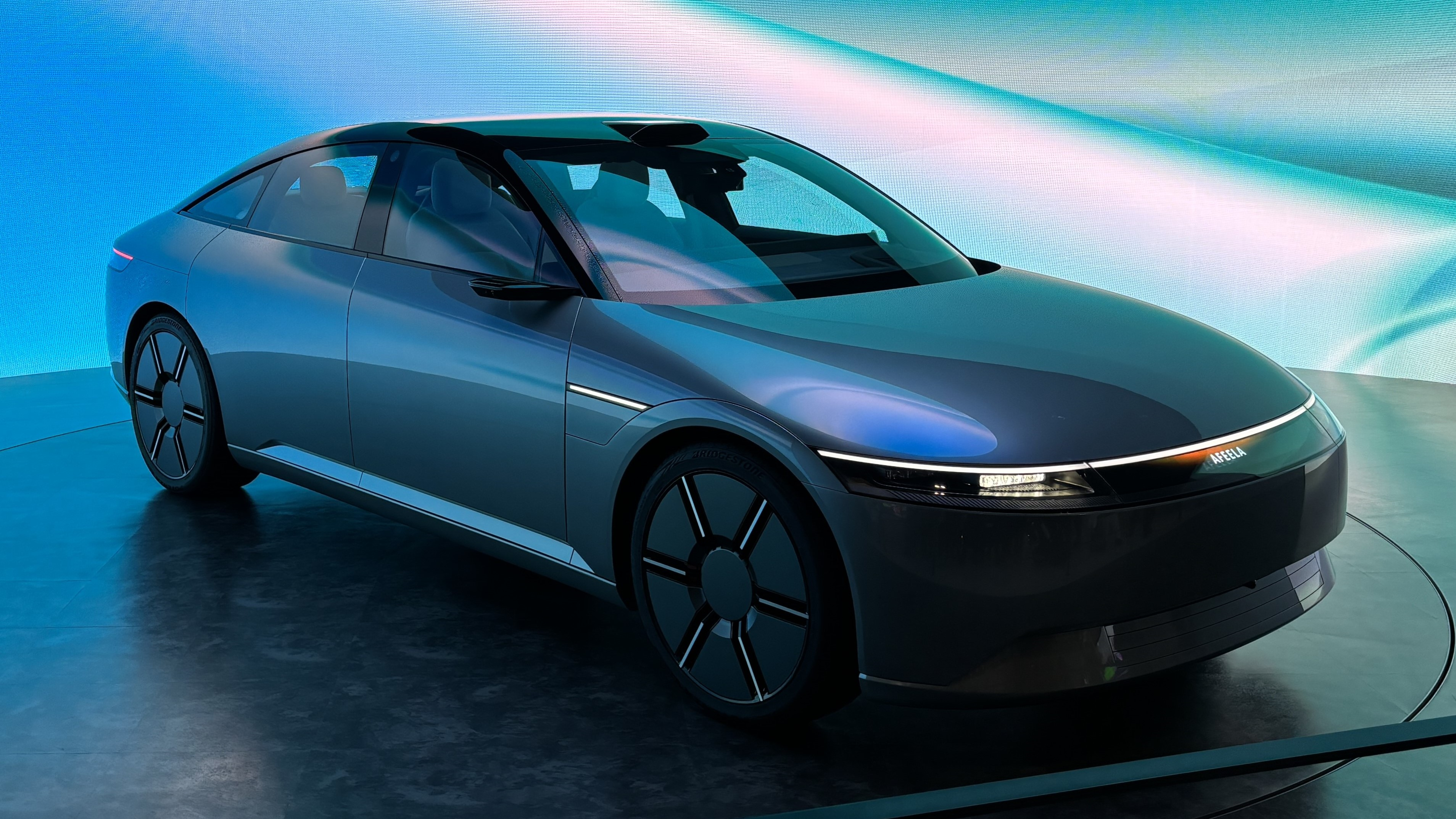
Afeela prototype at Japan Mobility Show (2023)

The concept version of the Afeela 1 was revealed in January 2023 at CES. A four-door sedan, it contains 45 cameras and sensors and features Level 3 automated driving capabilities. It utilzes Qualcomm Snapdragon SoC hardware to run its infotainment systems, while the cockpit and software architecture has been developed by Elektrobit Automotive, who also collaborated with Sony on software and UX for the Sony Vision-S, its first prototype. The vehicle utilizes Unreal Engine in its graphical interfaces.

The vehicle was planned to release in North America in the spring of 2026. Trial production of the vehicle began at the East Liberty Auto Plant in January 2026.

=== Afeela Prototype 2026 ===
The Afeela Prototype 2026 is an electric SUV concept first revealed in CES 2026. It was planned to release in 2028.
