= List of Sony products =

The following provides a partial list of products manufactured under the Sony brand.

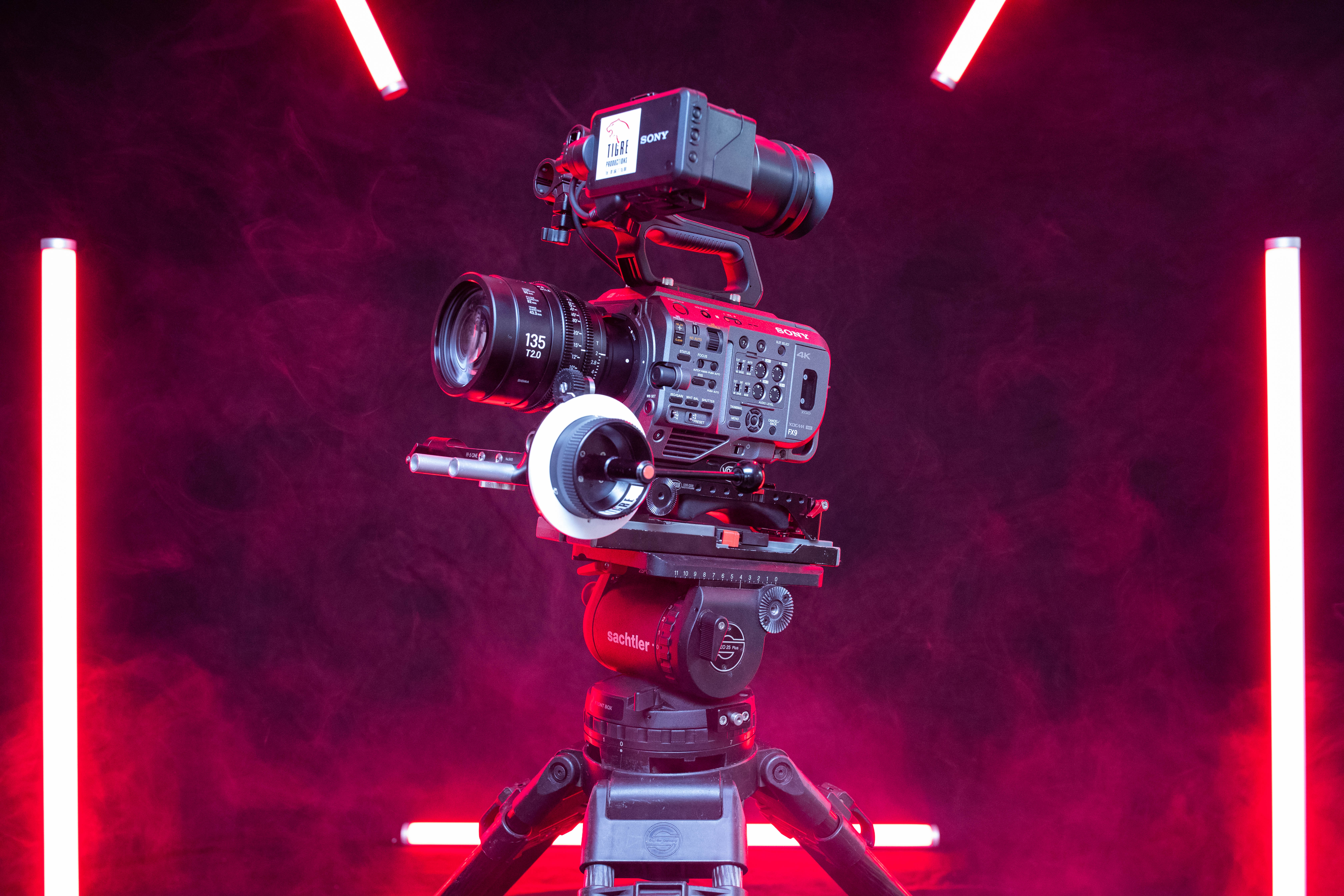
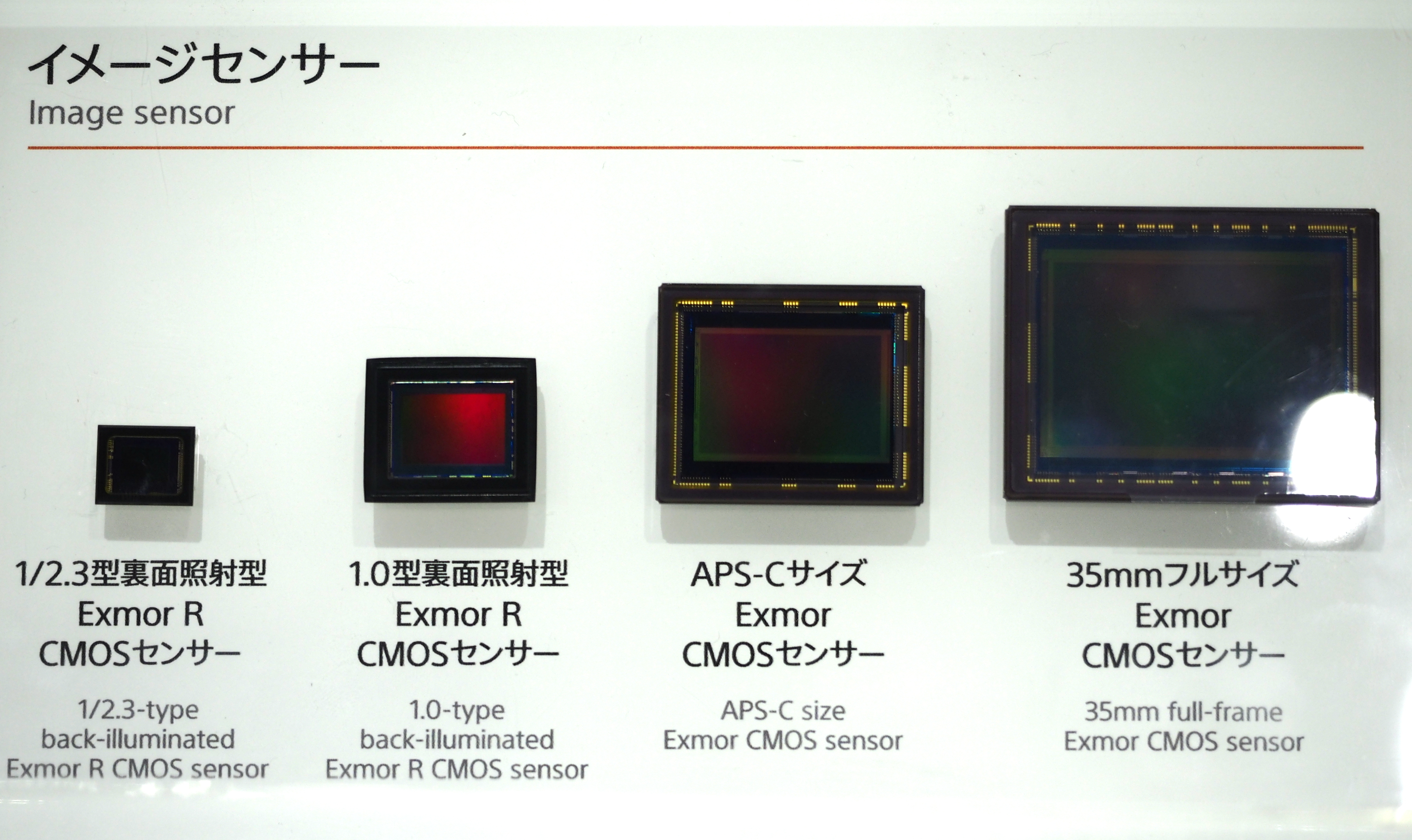
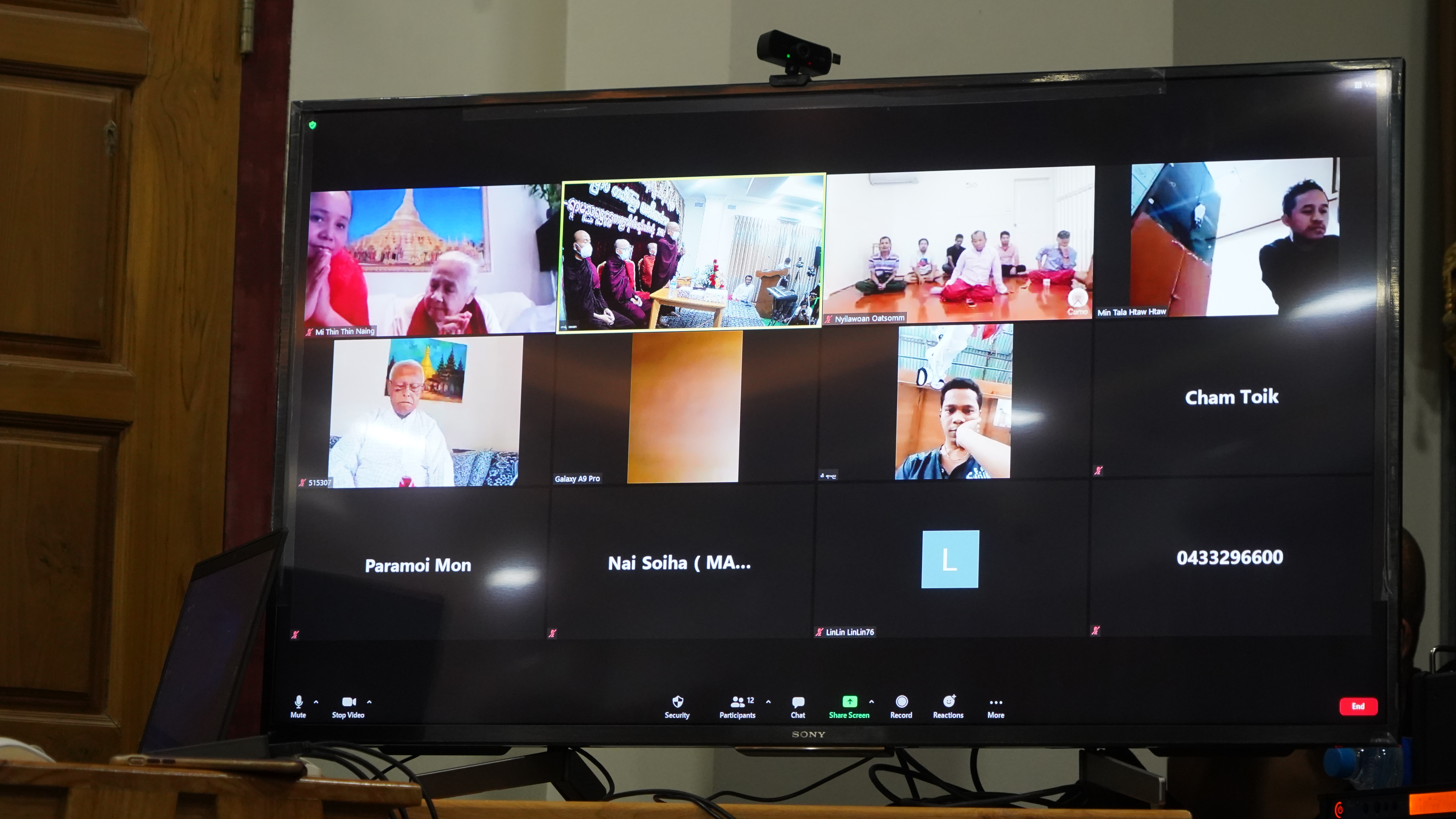
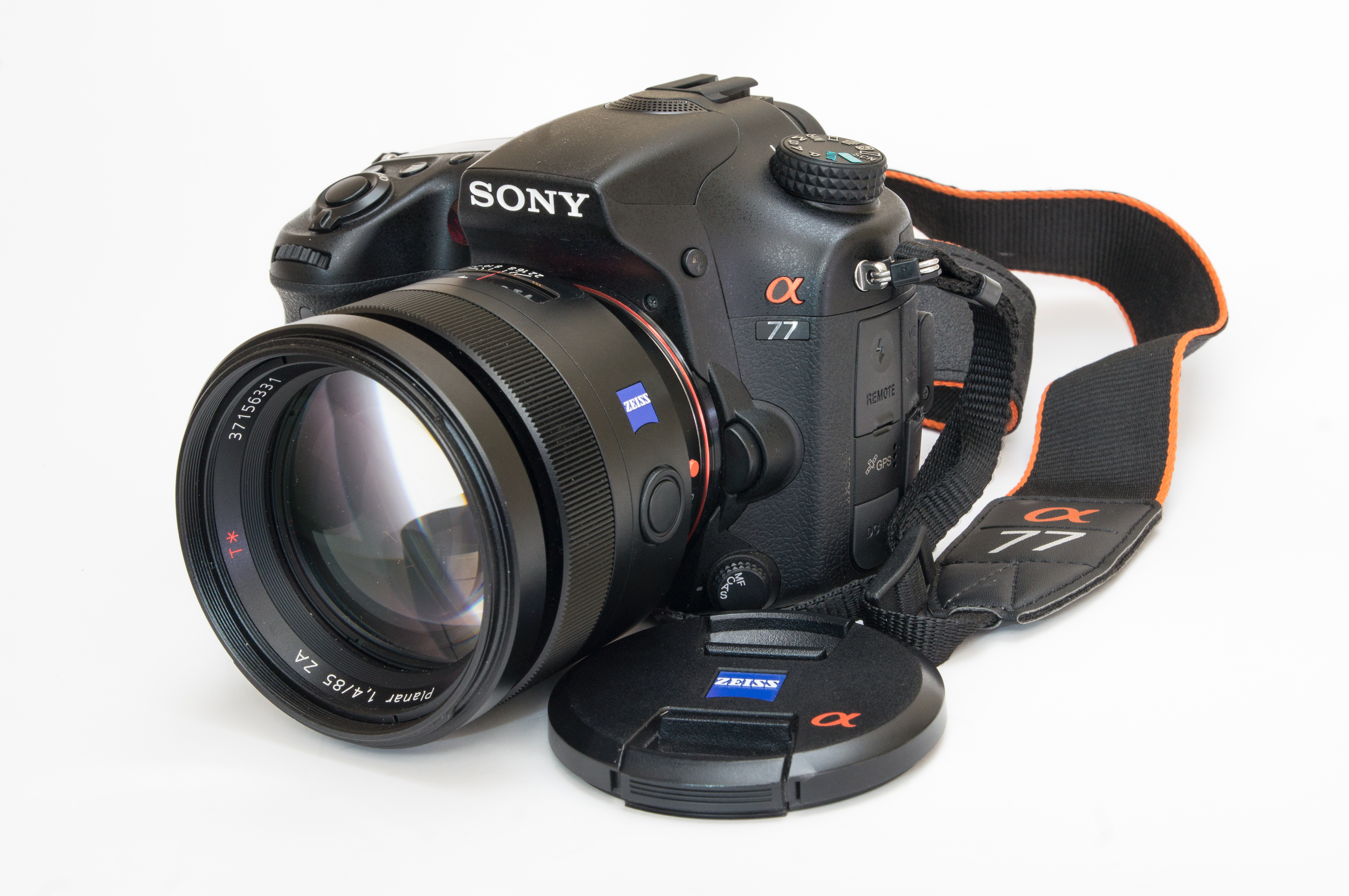
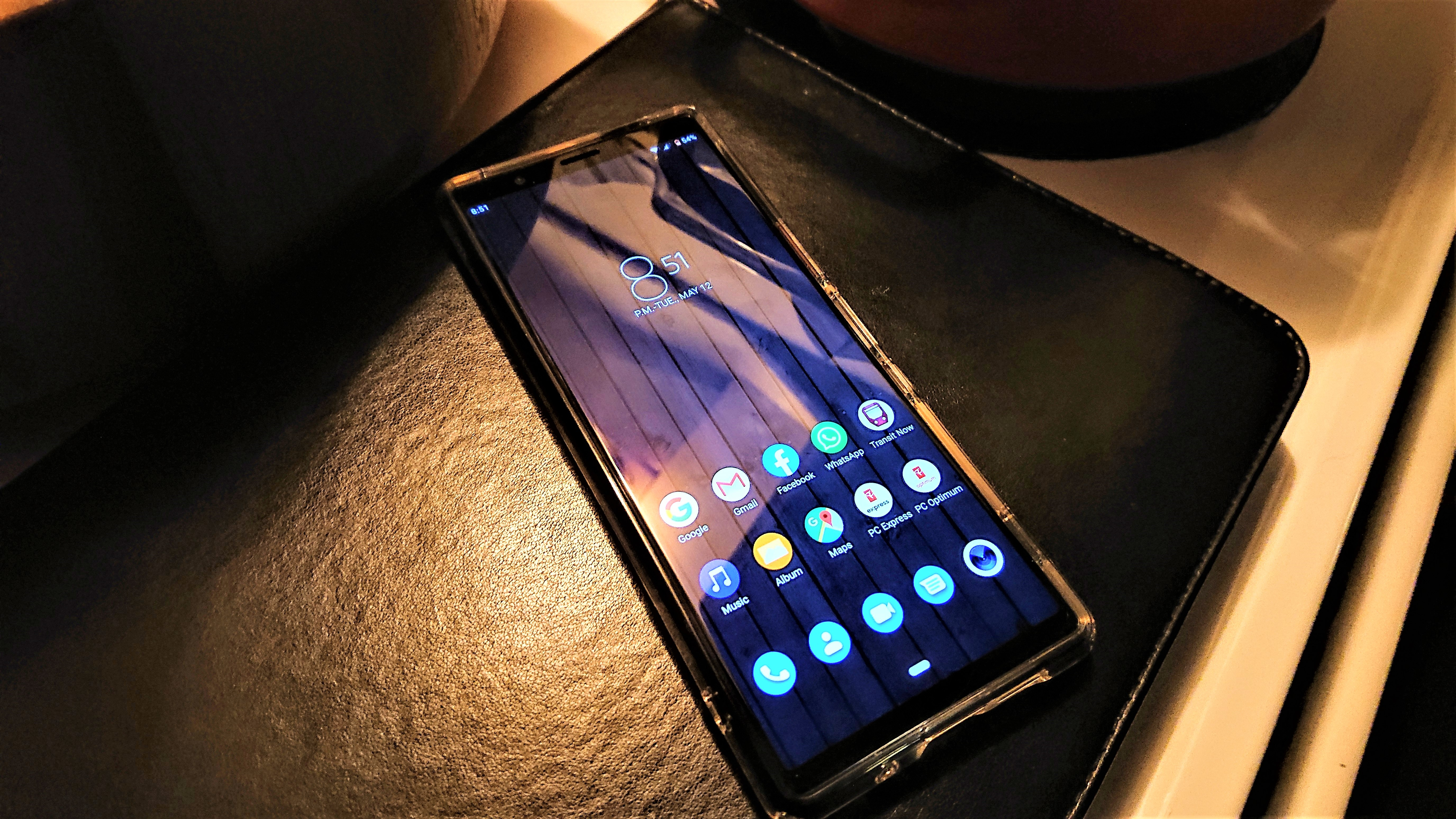
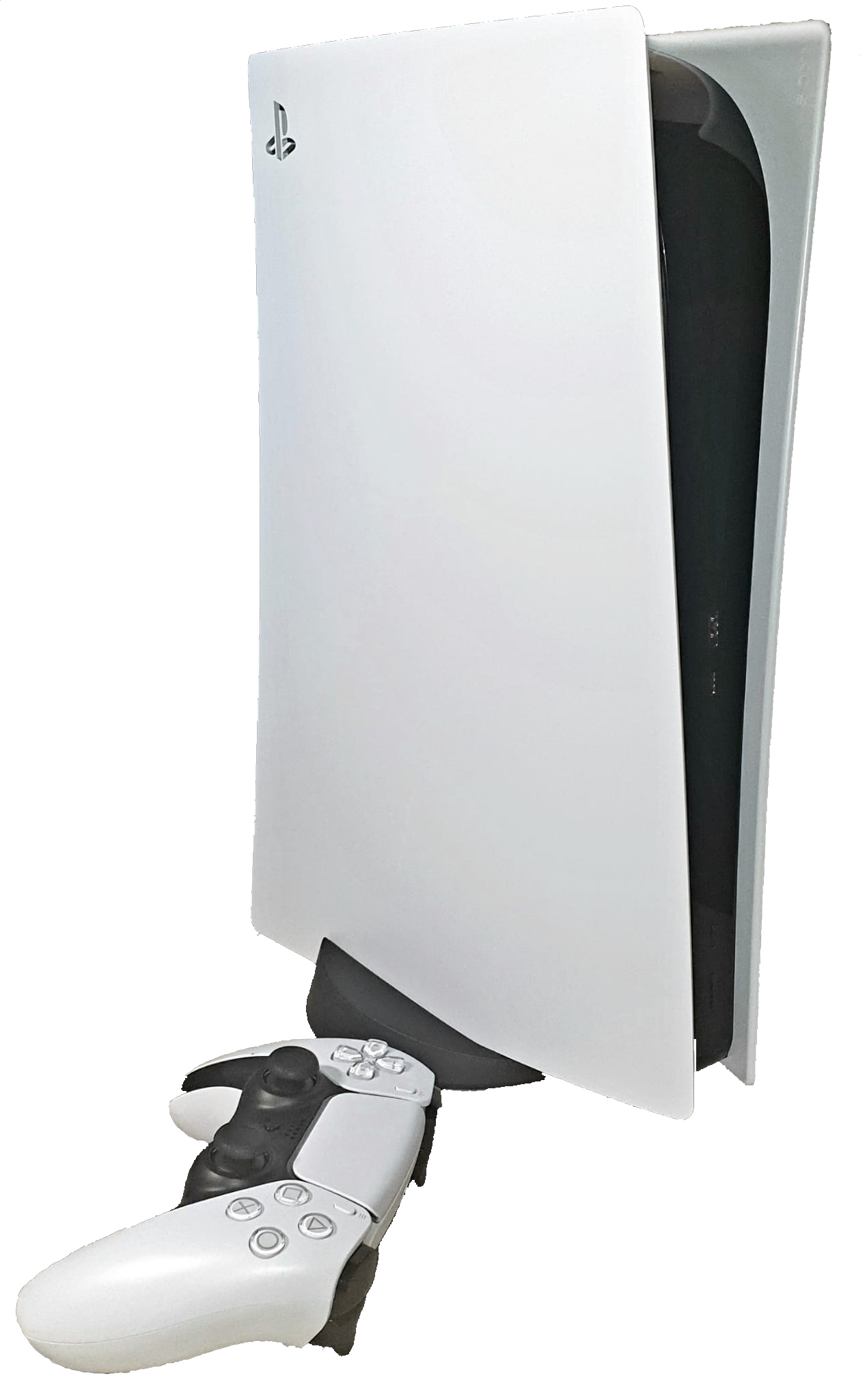
Various Sony products

== Electronics ==
=== Televisions & Home Cinema ===
- Televisions
- Home theater and Sound bars
- Blu-ray disc & DVD players

=== Audio ===
- Car audio
  - Receivers & players
  - Amplifiers
  - Speakers and subwoofers
  - Sony Marine
- Headphones
- MP3 players
  - Walkman
- High-resolution audio
- Wireless speakers
- 360 reality audio
- Speakers
  - Sony ULT Field 7
  - Sony Ult FIELD 5
- Audio systems
- Audio components
- Digital voice recorders
- Boomboxes, radios and portable CD players
- Home cinema

=== Cameras ===
- Interchangeable-lens Cameras
- Lenses
- Compact cameras
- Camcorders
- Action cameras
- Professional video cameras
- Cinema line cameras

=== Storage and cables ===
- Memory cards
- SSD disks
- Cables
- Blu-ray Disc/Ultra HD Blu-ray

=== Sony Olympus Medical Solutions ===
Sony Olympus Medical Solutions Inc. was founded on April 16, 2013, as a cooperation between Sony (owns 51%) and Olympus (owns 49%) with a goal to develop, design and sell surgical endoscopes with 4K+ resolution and 3D technologies.

=== Sony professional ===
Sony Professional offers professional solutions for cinematography, filmmaking, news production, live production, education, corporate and healthcare needs.

- Professional cameras
  - Studio and Broadcast Cameras
  - Digital Cinema Cameras
  - Camcorders
  - PTZ and Remote Cameras
- Broadcast and production
  - Professional Monitors
  - Decks and Recorders
  - Switchers and Live Systems
  - Professional Media
- Projectors
  - Professional Projectors
  - Home Cinema Projectors
- Professional displays
  - Displays
  - LED Walls
  - Software
- Archiving and content management
  - Optical Disc Archiving
  - Media Asset Management
  - IT Storage Media
  - Digitisation and Consolidation
- Medical imaging
  - Imaging Cameras
  - Monitors
  - Recorders and Storage
  - IP Imaging Platform
  - Printers and Print Media
- Audio systems
  - Professional Audio
  - Microphone Array System
  - Professional Speakers
- Smart systems
  - Workplace Management

== Semiconductors ==
Sony semiconductor business began in 1954. Today's division Sony Semiconductor Solutions Group was founded in 2015 and focuses on manufacturing image sensors, microdisplays, LSI, laser diodes.

=== Image sensors ===
Sony produces image sensors for automotive, industry, security, consumer cameras and mobile phones.

Image sensors for automotive industry

Image sensors for industry

- Area image sensor - industrial applications (Global Shutter and Rolling Shutter models)
- Polarization image sensor - capture polarization image with on-chip polarizer
- UV image sensor - capture images in Ultraviolet spectrum
- SWIR image sensor - capture images in Short-Wave infrared light spectrum
- ToF image sensor - creates 3D images by measuring the distance to the object
- Event-based vision sensor - event-based technology acquires high-speed data by only detecting luminance changes

Image sensors for security cameras

Security camera image sensors are equipped with STARVIS™ / STARVIS 2 technology, to capture clear images regardless of the brightness level. The outstanding photographic performance of the image sensors makes them indispensable to the security field.

Applications introduced for the purpose are:

- Intelligent transportation system (ITS) - facilitates license plate recognition, Road monitoring, and verifying the number of in-vehicle people on HOV lanes.
- Safety Monitoring - facilitates street monitoring; facility surveillance; disaster risk monitoring; firefighting; safety monitoring for nursing facilities, elder care and monitoring, home security systems, and dashcam.
- Dashcam - facilitates HDR imaging without overexposure under backlit conditions, high-sensitivity clear imaging at nighttime, high-resolution imaging, clearly capturing characters, on distant vehicle license plates, and image sensors suitable for dashcams.

Image sensors for consumer cameras

Image sensors for mobile devices

Image sensors for mobility use

- Image Sensor for Automotive Use
- SPAD Depth Sensor for Automotive LiDAR Applications

=== Large-scale integration (LSI) ===
- GPS/GNSS Receiver
- Cellular IoT Modem (External Link)
- Gigabit Video Interface
- Audio Codec IC

=== SPRESENSE ===
A low-power board computer for the IoT.

== Telecommunications equipment ==
=== Sony Network Communications ===
Sony Network Communications Inc. was founded in November 1995.

== Other ==
- Sony Computer Science Laboratories, Inc.
- Sony AI Inc.
- Sony VISION-S
- Sony Airpeak
- Sony Financial Group
- Small Optical Link for International Space Station (SOLISS)
- Vaio (5%)
