= Afeela 1 =

Japanese battery electric mid-size car

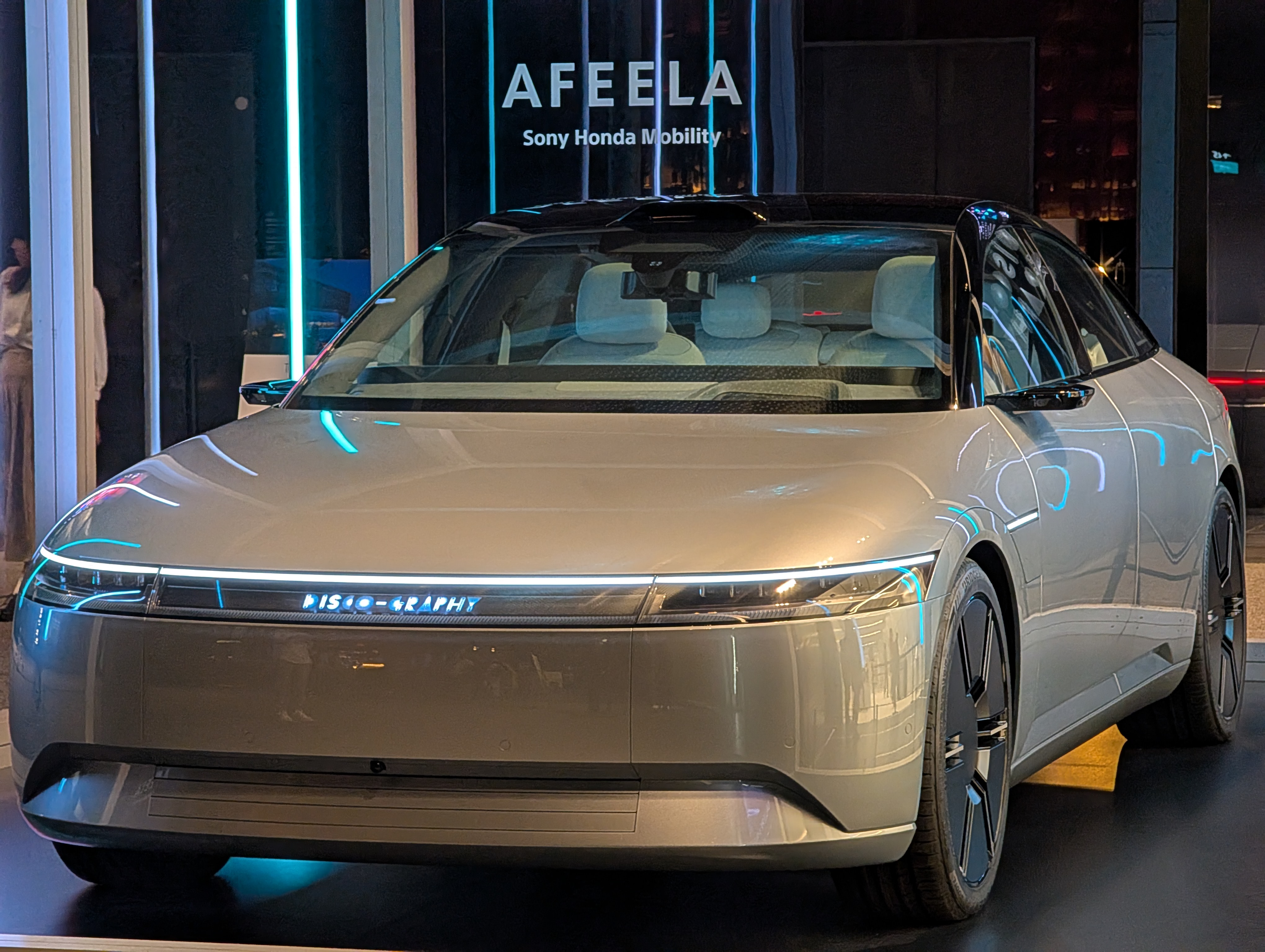

Overview
- Manufacturer: Sony Honda Mobility
- Production: 2026 (cancelled)
- Assembly: United States: East Liberty, Ohio (East Liberty Auto Plant)

Body and chassis
- Class: Mid-size car
- Body style: 5-door liftback
- Layout: Dual-motor, all-wheel-drive

Powertrain
- Electric motor: 2 x 180 kW
- Power output: 483 hp (360 kW; 490 PS)
- Battery: 91 kWh lithium-ion battery pack
- Electric range: 300 mi (480 km)
- Plug-in charging: SAEJ3400 (NACS) 150 kW DC

Dimensions
- Length: 4,914 mm (193.5 in)
- Height: 1,460 mm (57.5 in)

The Afeela 1, stylized as AFEELA 1 (Japanese: アフィーラ・１, Hepburn: Afīra Wan) is a cancelled battery electric mid-size liftback that was to be produced by Japanese joint venture company Sony Honda Mobility starting in 2026. It would have been the company's first production vehicle.

== Overview ==
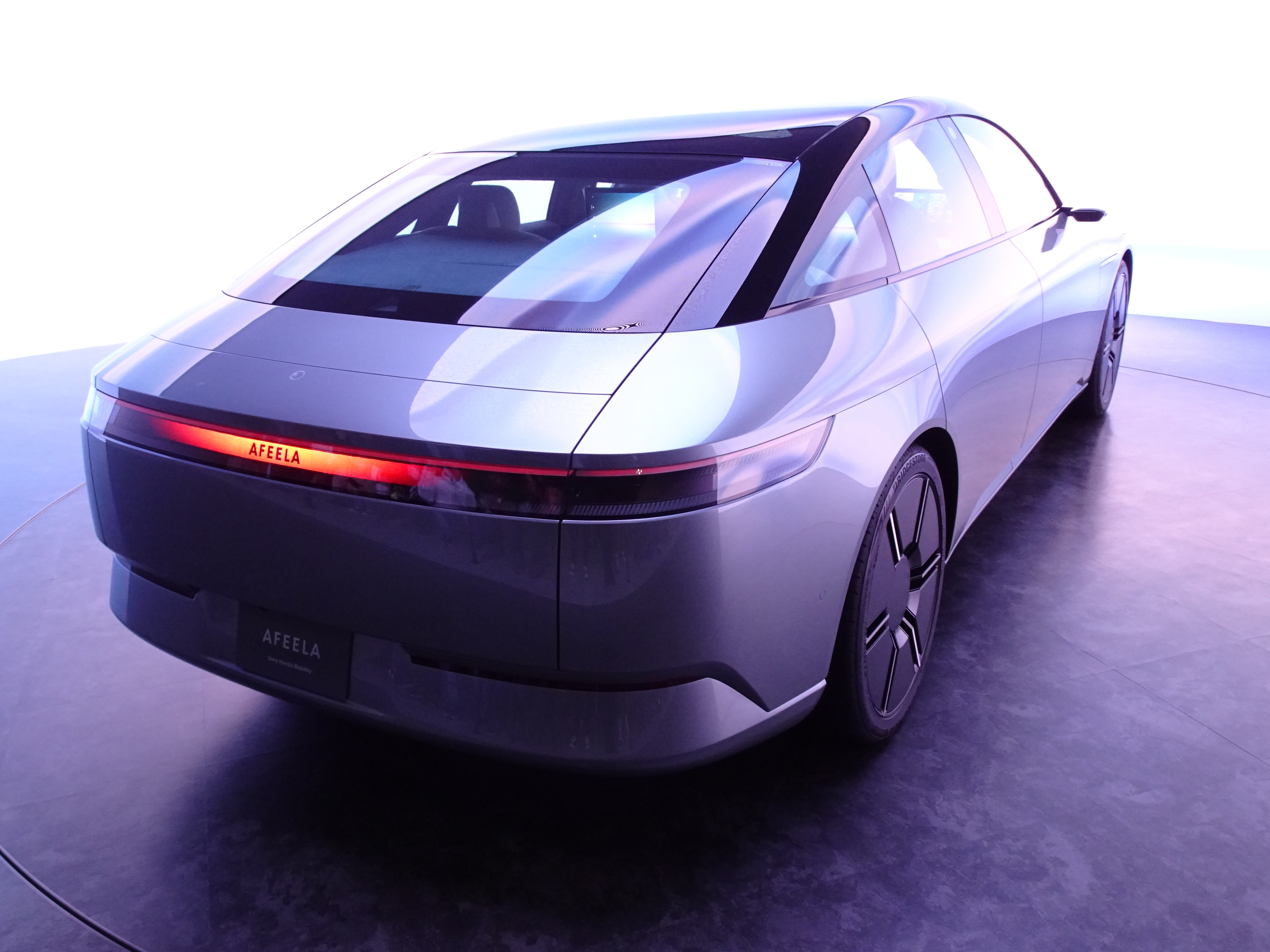
Rear view

=== Background ===
In January 2020 at the 53rd Consumer Electronics Show, Sony unveiled the Sony Vision-S concept car sedan. It was a project led by Sony's AI and Robotics team, and it was a functional prototype that showcased Sony's automotive technology. At the 54th Consumer Electronics Show in January 2021, the vehicle was renamed to the Vision-S 01, and Sony revealed that the vehicle had undergone road testing to further refine its systems.

In March 2022, Sony announced that it would form a joint venture with Honda to sell battery-electric vehicles.

On January 5, 2023, Sony Honda Mobility unveiled the Afeela 1 as a prototype at the 56th Consumer Electronics Show. The car features Level 3 automated driving capabilities under limited conditions.

The Afeela prototype also appears as a playable vehicle in Gran Turismo 7 (as the AFEELA Prototype 2024), which was added to the game in version 1.46. The production version was added in version 1.62.

On 2025 announced a partnership with Spotify releasing playlists for the in-car entertainment system.

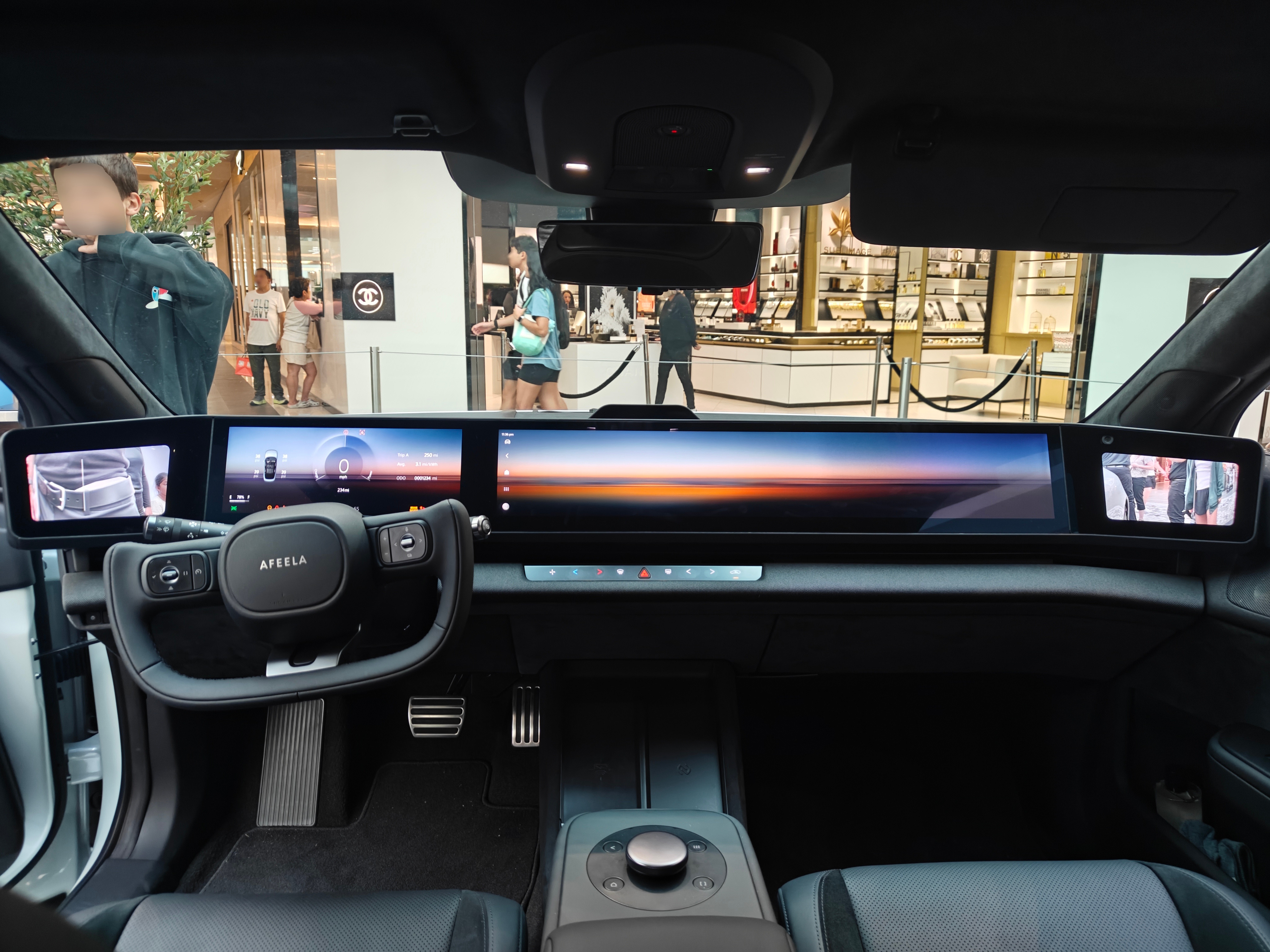
Production interior

=== Production ===
On January 8, 2025, Sony Honda Mobility unveiled the production version at CES 2025. The company says the Afeela 1 “pursues an interactive relationship between people and vehicles” and deliveries to customers will begin in mid-2026. Afeela will sell the EV in two versions, with prices starting from $89,900, including a three-year complimentary subscription to select features, including Afeela Intelligent Drive, Afeela Personal Agent, and entertainment content. The top trim is known as the Signature and is expected to start deliveries in mid-2026, while the base model is dubbed the Origin and will start production in 2026. Refundable reservations opened online directly after the reveal for US$200, initially exclusively for California residents.

On March 25, 2026, Sony Honda Mobility cancelled Afeela 1 production.

=== Powertrain ===
The Afeela 1 is available with a single all-wheel drive powertrain and battery pack option. It is powered by two 180 kW electric motors for a total of 483 horsepower (360 kW; 490 PS). Power is supplied by a 91 kWh lithium-ion battery pack, which can be recharged at up 150 kW when DC fast charging, and it provides a range of about 300 miles (480 km).

== See also ==
- Sony Honda Mobility
