= Spitzer Automotive =

American auto dealership group

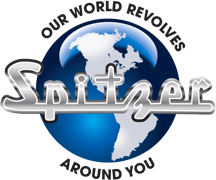
- Industry: Retail
- Founded: 1904; 122 years ago
- Founder: George G. Spitzer
- Headquarters: Elyria, Ohio, United States
- Area served: United States; Canada
- Key people: Alan Spitzer (CEO); Andrew Spitzer (COO); Alison Spitzer (president); Joey Mastrodonato (CFO); Larry Horvat (CIO); Deborah Noska (secretary)
- Parent: Spitzer Management
- Website: www.spitzer.com

Spitzer Automotive is an American automobile dealership which was founded in 1904 by George G. Spitzer. It is a subsidiary of Spitzer Management which is based in Elyria, Ohio, United States.

== History ==
Spitzer Automotive was founded in Grafton in 1904 by George G. Spitzer as a hardware store which included a livery stable. They later extended and began renting horse-drawn buggies to train passengers.

In 1945, John Spitzer assumed control. He expanded the retail chain to 14 different locations in four states. During his tenure, Spitzer developed Spitzer method which was used by Ford Motor Company in their corporate trainings. John Spitzer died in 1992.

In the 1980s, Alan Spitzer and Del Spitzer assumed control of daily operations from John Spitzer. Under their leadership, Spitzer expanded its dealearship in Florida, Ohio, and Pennsylvania. They also diversified their business and invested in marinas, farms in Lorain and Medina counties, developed Brentwood Lake Village, and the Pheasant Run Golf Course.

During the 2007-2009 recession in the United States, automotive retailers were largely effected. In 2009, Chrysler and General Motors became bankrupt and as a result discontinued their contracts with Spitzer and other auto dealerships. Alan and Alison Spitzer lobbied for Automobile Dealer Economic Rights Restoration Act to restore auto dealers rights. The effort resulted in restoration of about one thousand dealerships. They also wrote a book, named Grand Theft Auto, about this development.

In 2015, Spitzer was inducted into the One Hundred Year Club of the Western Reserve.

As of 2026, Spitzer operates twenty-seven auto dealerships in Ohio, Pennsylvania and Florida.
