= National Association of Minority Auto Dealers =

The National Association of Minority Auto Dealers (NAMAD) was developed to assist in promoting minority auto dealers in the United States.

NAMAD was initially founded to expand and support the number of African American auto dealer franchisees. The organization later expanded its mandate and opened the ranks of the organization to include other minorities. NAMAD was founded in 1980 and has grown to a membership of 650 minorities seeking to obtain their own dealerships. In recent years, over 100 owner-operator members of NAMAD have employed 10,000 employees, and generated over 6 billion in sales within the industry.

== See also ==
Automobile Dealer Economic Rights Restoration Act
