= Tower Heist (soundtrack) =

Tower Heist (Original Motion Picture Soundtrack)

Film score and soundtrack album by Christophe Beck and Jake Monaco
- Released: November 1, 2011
- Studio: Manhattan Center, New York City; MSR, New York City; Eastwood Scoring Stage, Warner Bros. Studios, Los Angeles
- Genre: Film score; soundtrack album
- Length: 40:00
- Label: Varèse Sarabande; Back Lot Music; Colosseum
- Producer: Jake Monaco

Christophe Beck chronology
Crazy, Stupid, Love (2011)	Tower Heist (2011)	The Muppets (2011)

Tower Heist (Original Motion Picture Soundtrack) is the soundtrack to the 2011 film Tower Heist directed by Brett Ratner. The film's musical score is composed by Christophe Beck and produced by Jake Monaco. It was distributed by Varèse Sarabande, Back Lot Music and Colosseum Records on November 1, 2011, three days before the film's release.

== Background ==
In June 2011, it was announced that Christophe Beck would score music for Tower Heist. Ratner was in search of a different composer, before executives at Universal Pictures recommended Beck for scoring the film. During his meet with Beck at his studio in Santa Monica, California, Ratner hired him on the basis that he would score a main theme for the film. He wanted the film's music to be urbanized and a "quintessential New York heist movie" referencing The Hot Rock (1972) and The Taking of Pelham One Two Three (1974), though Ratner felt the score is huge, he also admitted that "it's cool, sophisticated, emotional, it's got so much color". He eventually appreciated Beck for providing a soundscape resembling the 1970s.

== Reception ==
Filmtracks.com wrote "You'll have to appreciate the snazzy title theme's five or six major presentations for that album to really mean anything to you, however, because outside of that modernized but somewhat mundane identity of funk, Beck could very well have been on autopilot for the rest." Daniel Schweiger of Assignment X called it as "a deft jam session of symphonic weight and popping excitement, a theme-driven rush that turns the penthouse of all evil into a cool ride on the retro-jazz subway car to rule them all." Peter Debruge ofVariety summarized that "Christophe Beck's funky score blares its horns so insistently, one can't help but feel anxious." Todd McCarthy of The Hollywood Reporter described it as a "zippy" score reminiscent of the 1970s. Alonso Duralde of TheWrap called it as "jazzy Lalo Schifrin–esque", and Drew Taylor of IndieWire described it as "propulsive". Brad Brevet of Comingsoon.net wrote "Christophe Beck's redundant score tries to convince us things are exciting". The score was shortlisted as one among the 97 contenders for Academy Award for Best Original Score at the 84th Academy Awards.

== Track listing ==
Tower Heist (Original Motion Picture Soundtrack) track listing
No.	Title	Length
1.	"Theme from Tower Heist"	3:30
2.	"Code Black"	2:52
3.	"Shawnfrontation"	2:07
4.	"The Germ"	1:55
5.	"Lester's Loss"	0:58
6.	"My Little Bitch"	1:28
7.	"Macy's Day"	2:45
8.	"The Marshall Swindle"	1:09
9.	"Right at Rikers"	0:44
10.	"Fifty Dollar Thrift Lift"	1:55
11.	"The Charlie Deception"	0:55
12.	"We Go On Snoopy"	3:00
13.	"Courthouse Con"	1:50
14.	"Grand Theft Auto"	3:22
15.	"Gonna Call Ralph"	1:06
16.	"Strong Box Situation"	0:58
17.	"Shaft Fail"	0:48
18.	"Odessa's Cake"	1:39
19.	"Arrested"	0:53
20.	"Shawstafari"	2:42
21.	"Gold Rush"	2:09
22.	"End Titles"	1:29
Total length:		40:00

== Personnel ==
Credits adapted from CD liner notes.

- Music – Christophe Beck, Jake Monaco
- Music producer – Christophe Beck
- Score producer – Jake Monaco
- Digital recordist – Larry Mah
- Recording and mixing – Casey Stone
- Mixing crew – Ian Kagey, Matt Carter
- Mixing assistance – Derik Lee
- Mastering – Patricia Sullivan
- Score co-ordinator – Leo Birenberg
- Music consultant – Randall Poster
- Executive producer – Brett Ratner, Brian Grazer

Orchestra

- Orchestration – Tim Davies
- Conductor – Ben Wallfisch
- Contractor – Sandra Park
- Music preparation – Mark Graham, Tony Finno
- Scoring crew – Bryan Smith, Darren Moore, Jaren Clark, Rich Hill, Roy Clark, Scott Young, Yuri Suzuki

Instruments

- Bass – Jacqui Danilow, Kingsley Wood, Rachel Calin, Satoshi Okamoto, Shawn Conley
- Bassoon – Dan Shelly, Mark Romatz
- Brass – Morris Kainuma
- Cello – Alan Stepansky, Brian Hatton, Jeanne LeBlanc, Jerry Grossman, Maria Kitsopoulos, Mary Wooten, Sarah Seiver, Sophie Shao, Susan Babini
- Clarinet – Jim Ognibene, Pavel Vinnitsky
- Flute – Kathleen Nester, Nadine Asin
- Harp – Barbara Allen
- Horn – Alana Vegter, Brad Gemeinhardt, Cara Kizer, Julia Pilant, Michelle Barker, Pat Milando
- Oboe – Pedro Diaz, Shelley Woodworth
- Percussion – Erik Charlston, Gordon Gottlieb, Joe Passaro, Rolando Morales
- Saxophone – Andy Snitzer, Lawrence Feldman
- Technician – Angie Teo
- Timpani – Ben Herman
- Trombone – Demian Austin, George Flynn, Jim Markey, Mike Davis, Patrick Herb
- Trumpet – Jim Ross, John Sheppard, Ray Riccomini, Tony Kadleck
- Viola – David Creswell, Desiree Elsevier, Irene Breslaw, Junah Chung, Karen Dreyfus, Karin Brown, Kathryn Lockwood, Kyle Armbrust, Becky Young, Robert Rinehart, Vivek Kamath
- Violin – Ann Lehmann, Asmira Woodward, Cathy Sim, Liz Lim, Emily Popham, Hyunju Lee, Jeanine Wynton, Jennifer Kim, Jenny Strenger, Jung Sun Yoo, Karen Marx, Katherine Fong, Kuan Cheng Lu, Laura Seaton, Lisa Kim, Matt Lehmann, Ming Hsin, Misa Iwama, Nancy McAlhany, Peter Bahng, Rob Shaw, Sein Ryu, Shan Jiang, Sharon Yamada, Suzanne Ornstein, Tom Carney, Wen Qian, Yurika Mok

Rhythm section

- Bass – John Patitucci, Mike Valerio
- Drums – John Robinson, Matt Chamberlain, Peter Erskine
- Guitar – George Doering
- Keyboards – Randy Kerber
- Percussion – Kevin Ricard
- Vibraphone – Wade Culbreath
