= Alison Spitzer =

American businesswoman and author (born 1980)

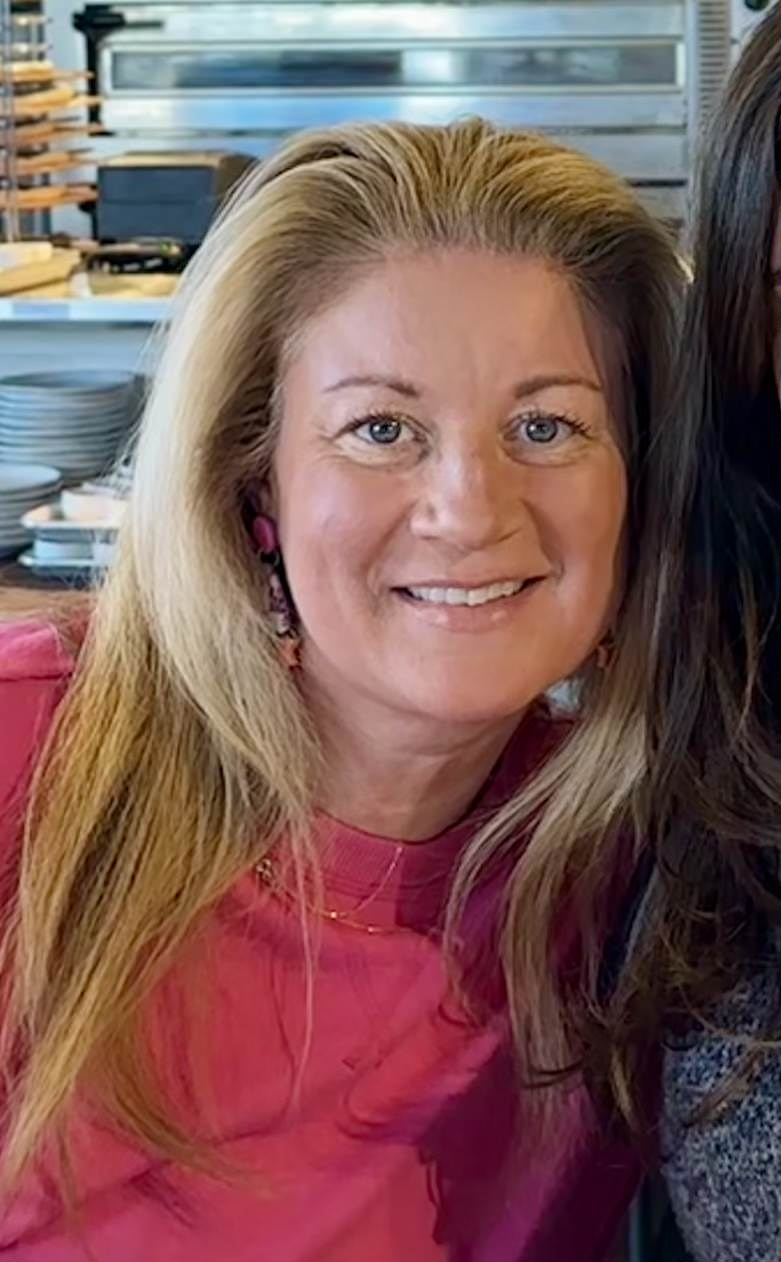
- Born: July 12, 1980 (age 46)
- Education: American University
- Occupations: Businesswoman author
- Years active: 2007–present
- Known for: Legislative advocacy in the automotive industry
- Notable work: Grand Theft Auto

Alison Spitzer (born 1980) is an American business executive and author. She is the president of Spitzer Management, where she led the company's transition toward e-commerce.

Spitzer is a co-author of Grand Theft Auto and has been involved in legislative advocacy within the automotive industry.

== Early life and education ==
Alison Spitzer was raised in a family involved in the automobile industry. She initially planned to pursue a career in international relations and earned a master's degree in international communications from American University.

== Career ==
Spitzer began her career in New York City at Cassidy & Associates. In 2007, she joined Spitzer Auto in Florida. Over the following years, she redirected the company's operations toward online sales and expanded its e-commerce presence. She set up the company's e-commerce department and launched multiple websites, including individual sites for each franchise.

Following the bankruptcies of General Motors and Chrysler, Spitzer advocated for legislation to support dealerships affected by the closures. She also co-authored the book, Grand Theft Auto.

Spitzer currently serves as president of Spitzer Management.

== Personal life ==
Spitzer married Jeremy Swartz in 2008, They have three children.

== Awards ==
- Women's Automotive Association International Award (2014)
- Automotive News 40 Under 40 (2012)
- Automotive News 100 Leading Women in the North American Auto Industry (2015)
- Crain's Cleveland Business Forty Under 40 (2018)
- The TIME Dealer of the Year award (2026 nominated)

== Bibliography ==
- Spitzer, Alison; Alan Spitzer (2011). Grand Theft Auto
