= Maryann Keller =

American automotive businessperson

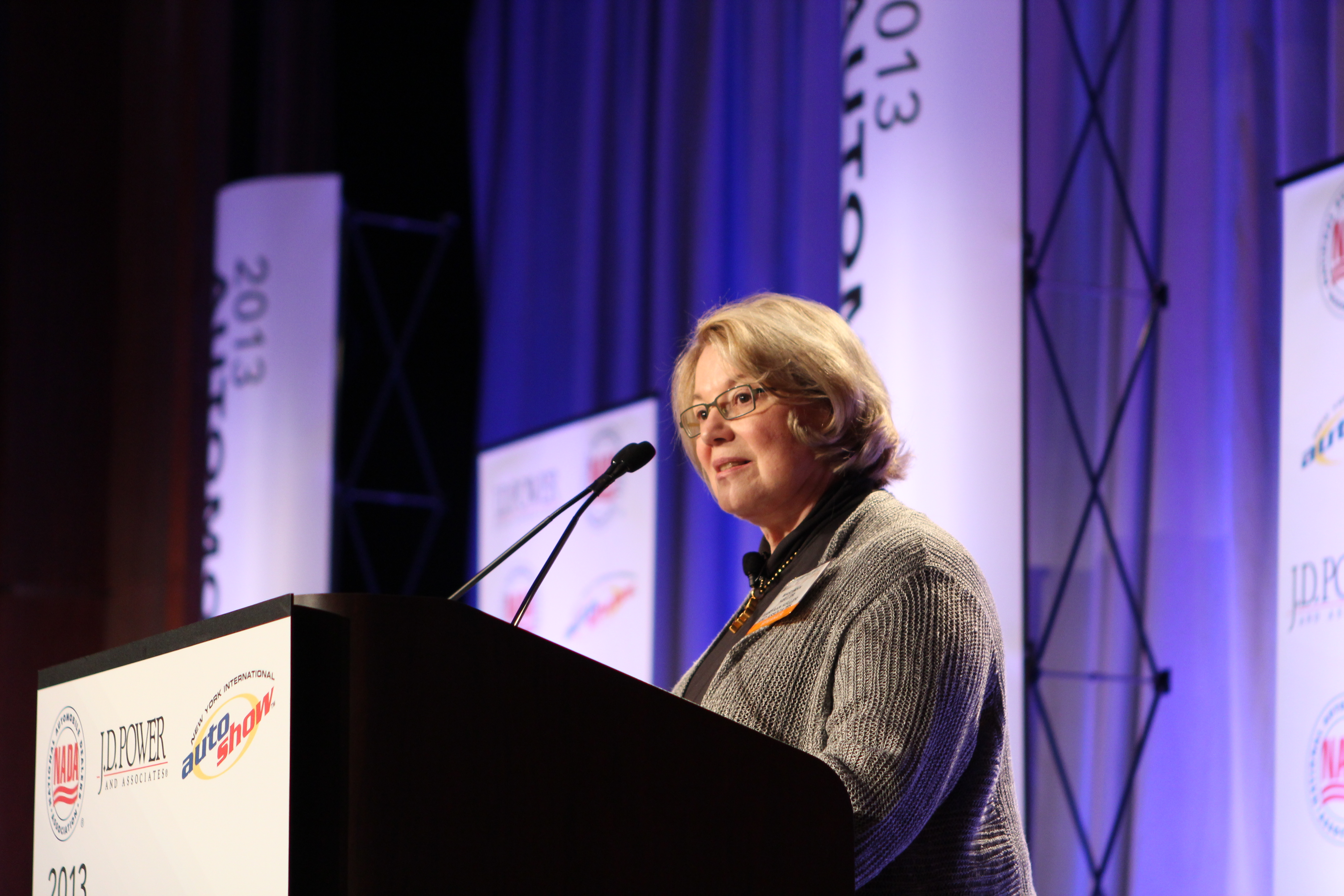
- Born: Maryann Katula; December 31, 1943
- Died: June 16, 2022 (aged 78)
- Education: Bachelor of Science
- Alma mater: Rutgers University
- Occupations: Automotive industry analyst, author
- Years active: 40
- Known for: Automotive industry contributions

Maryann Keller was an American automotive industry analyst and author. Keller covered the auto industry as a Wall Street analyst from the 1970s until the 1990s. She was last the principal at Maryann Keller & Associates, an automotive consultancy firm she founded in 2001. She died on June 16, 2022, at the age of 78.

== Personal life ==
Maryann Keller, née Katula, grew up in Perth Amboy, New Jersey. Her parents were Henry Katula, a factory hand at National Lead Company, and his wife, Helen, a nurse. Keller married Jay Chai a former vice-chairman and CEO of the Japanese trading company Itochu in 1984. Maryann and Jay have three children.

== Education ==
Keller attended Rutgers University, where she obtained a bachelor's degree in chemistry.

== Career ==
Keller became an auto analyst in the 1970s and according to the New York Times was "the first woman to be an auto analyst" in the United States. In 1989 she published Rude Awakening; The Rise, Fall and Struggle to Recover at General Motors which predicted the rise of Japanese automakers to the detriment of the Detroit three. The book won the Eccles Prize for Economic Literature from Columbia University.

After leaving her position as a Wall Street analyst in 1999, Keller managed Priceline.com's automotive division and later started her own consultancy company in 2001.

== Publications ==
- 1989 Rude Awakening; The Rise, Fall and Struggle to Recover at General Motors
- 1993, "Collision: GM, Toyota, and Volkswagen and the Race to Own the Twenty-first Century."
