= Sony Vision-S =

Overview
- Manufacturer: Sony Mobility Inc.
- Parent company: Sony

Body and chassis
- Layout: dual motor AWD
- Vehicles: Vision-S 01 & -S 02

Dimensions
- Wheelbase: 3,030 mm (119.3 in)

The Sony Vision-S is an all-electric automobile platform that was developed by Sony, with the first model unveiled at the 2020 Consumer Electronics Show (CES) in Las Vegas as the Vision-S Concept. When the second concept was unveiled in 2022 as the Vision-S 02, the original concept was retroactively renamed to Vision-S 01. Sony plans to use the Vision-S platform to develop future electric vehicles under a new wholly owned subsidiary, Sony Mobility Inc., which will assume responsibility for the Vision-S platform and vehicle development in mid-2022. The Vision-S platform is fully electric and designed to emphasize the user experience of autonomous driving, as well as accommodate the growth of technology in future models.

== History ==
The Vision-S concept was designed by Sony's AI/Robotics division in collaboration with multiple companies in the automotive sector, including Magna International, Continental AG, Elektrobit, Benteler, and Bosch, featuring the latest technologies from Sony and its partners related to the automotive sector, such as always-on connectivity, sensory devices, and autonomous driving. The first Vision-S was manufactured by Magna Steyr. The project was led by Sony's AI/Robotics team, previously responsible for the AIBO robotic dog, and engineering and initial testing were performed at the Magna-Steyr facilities in Graz, Austria.

At the 2021 CES, Sony provided an update on the Vision-S concept after road testing to refine the vehicle's sensor suite and features. Izumi Kawanishi, the chief executive of Sony AI/Robotics, outlined Sony's vision in a May 2021 keynote address; like AIBO and the autonomous drone Airpeak also unveiled at the 2021 CES, Vision-S was meant to showcase Sony's development of artificial intelligence. The three guiding concepts of Vision-S are safety, entertainment, and adaptability; safety would be implemented through autonomous driving, while entertainment is what Sony is perhaps best known for, and adaptability refers to the planned continuous evolution of features as well as contributions to environmental sustainability.

For the 2022 CES, Sony exhibited a second concept based on the same platform, the Vision-S 02 sport-utility vehicle and announced they were forming a new company, Sony Mobility, which will focus on the group's electric car efforts. In March 2022, Sony and Honda announced they would launch an unnamed joint venture to plan, develop, and sell battery-electric vehicles starting in 2025. Initially, the vehicles would be manufactured at one of Honda's existing factories.

== Design ==
Daisuke Ishii stated the "S" in Vision-S stands for sensing, safety, society, and Sony. The Vision-S platform is equipped with two 200 kW electric motors and all-wheel drive. The drivetrain has a wheelbase of 3030mm and uses air-spring Double wishbone suspension.

Inside, a panoramic touchscreen is built into the dashboard, accompanied by Sony's 360 Reality Audio. The backs of the driver and front passenger's seat are each equipped with a 10.1 in-diagonal (260 mm) display, and the car has a 5G cellular connection, allowing passengers to stream and play games by remotely connecting to PlayStation game consoles.

=== Safety ===
At launch, the Vision-S concept included 33 sensors. After further testing and refinement, the concept was upgraded to carry 40 sensors (18 cameras, 18 radars, and 4 lidar), including CMOS, solid state lidar, Radar and time-of-flight cameras which collectively form an advanced driver assistance suite called "Safety Cocoon". Safety Cocoon will be capable of simpler lane and parking assist features in the beginning but through the use of over-the-air updates, Sony hopes to achieve a level 4 or higher of self-driving.

== Models ==
=== Vision-S 01 ===
Sony Vision-S 01
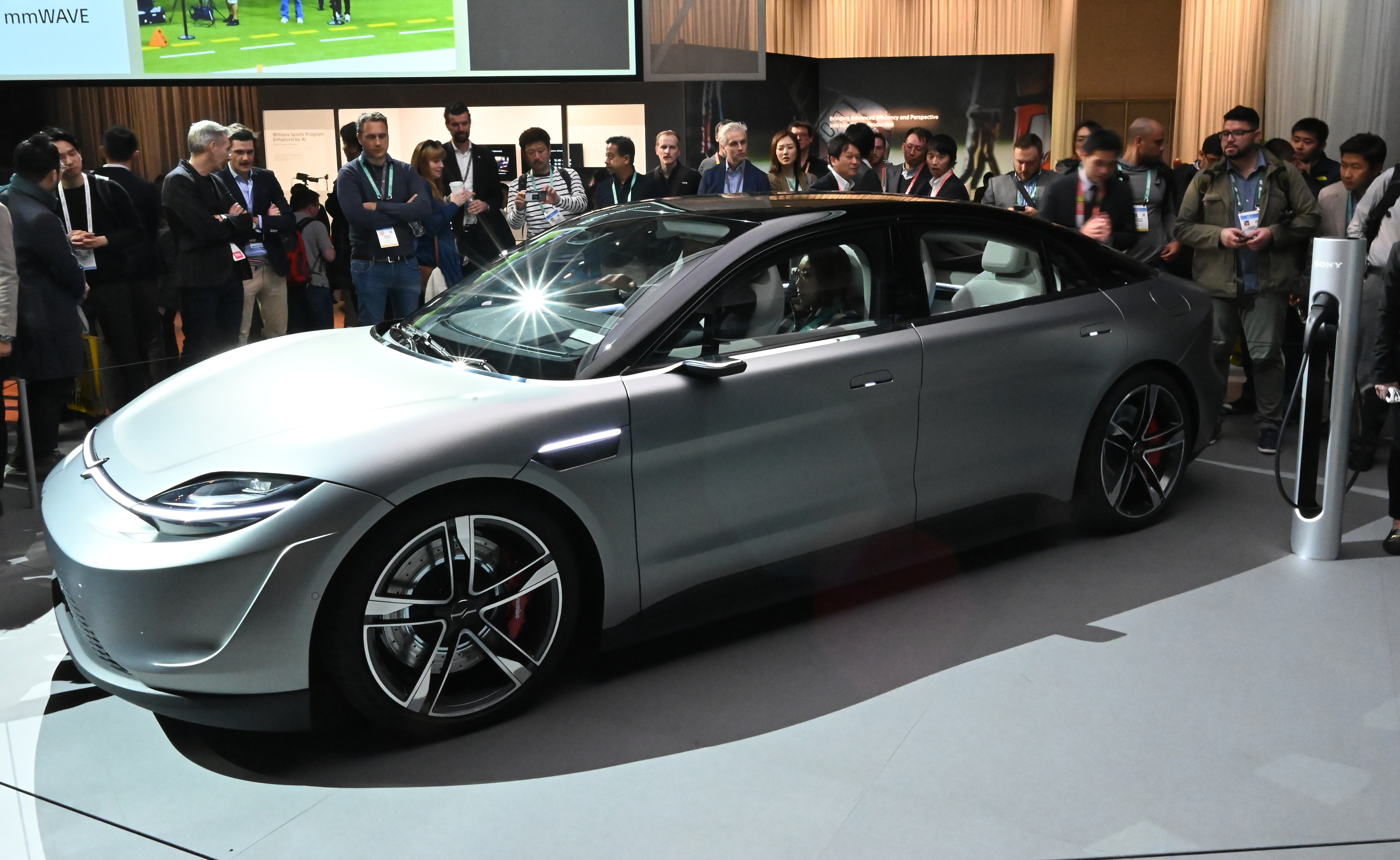
- Vision-S 01

Overview
- Production: 2020

Body and chassis
- Class: Mid-size car (E)
- Body style: 4-door fastback sedan
- Platform: Sony Vision-S

Powertrain
- Electric range: Not disclosed

Dimensions
- Length: 4,895 mm (192.7 in)
- Width: 1,900 mm (74.8 in)
- Height: 1,450 mm (57.1 in)
- Curb weight: 2,350 kg (5,180 lb)

Sony Vision-S 01 (previously known as the Vision-S Concept vehicle at its 2020 launch) is a 4-seat sedan and was the first vehicle developed on the Vision-S concept. It uses the common Vision-S platform and drivetrain, giving Vision-S 01 a 0–100 km/h (0–62 mph) time of 4.8 seconds and a top speed of 240 km/h (150 mph). The Vision-S concept was unveiled at the 2020 Consumer Electronics Show in Las Vegas by CEO Kenichiro Yoshida.

During development, the Vision-S Concept/01 was known under the code name "Safety Cocoon". After the vehicle was brought back to Graz for further testing and development, it was sent to Tokyo in July 2020 for on-road testing.

=== Vision-S 02 ===
Sony Vision-S 02

Body and chassis
- Class: Mid-size crossover SUV (J)
- Body style: 5-door SUV
- Platform: Sony Vision-S

Powertrain
- Electric range: Not disclosed

Dimensions
- Length: 4,895 mm (192.7 in)
- Width: 1,930 mm (76.0 in)
- Height: 1,651 mm (65.0 in)
- Curb weight: 2,480 kg (5,467 lb)

Viewers of the publicity video that accompanied the original Vision-S concept noted that a crossover SUV appeared to be in development at the same time. The Sony Vision-S 02 is a 7-seat SUV, the second vehicle developed on the Sony Vision-S platform and unveiled at CES 2022. Acceleration numbers have not been disclosed, but considering that the SUV is 130 kg heavier than the Vision-S 01 sedan, the 0–100 km/h time is likely more than the 4.8 seconds of the sedan. The Vision-S 02 has a top speed of 112 mph (180 km/h).

== See also ==
Competitive models:

- Lucid Air
- Porsche Taycan
- Tesla Model Y
