= National Automobile Dealers Association =

American trade organization

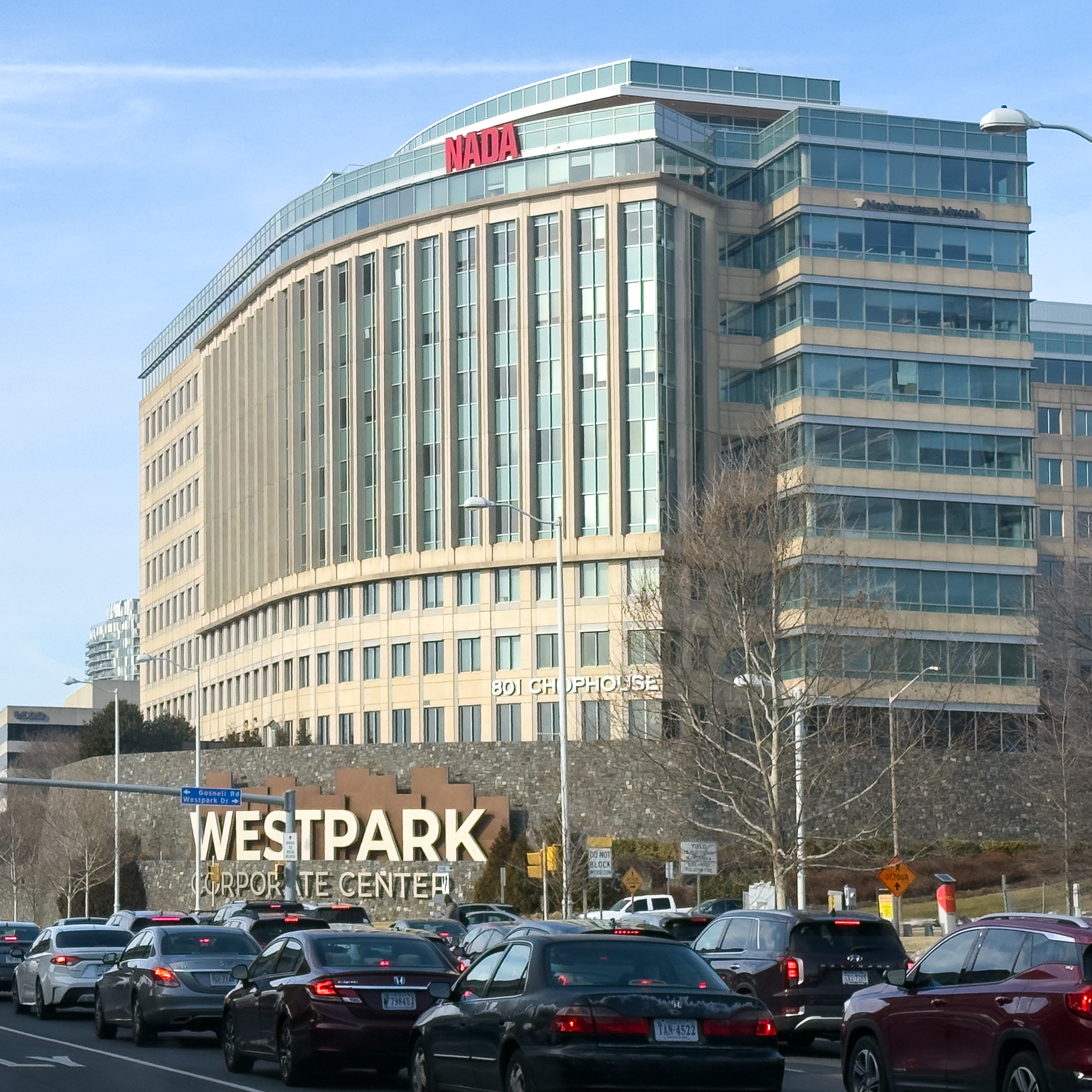
- Headquarters in Tysons Corner, Virginia
- Abbreviation: NADA
- Formation: 1917; 109 years ago
- Founded at: Chicago, Illinois, U.S.
- Legal status: 501(c)(6) trade organization
- Headquarters: 8484 Westpark Drive
- Location: Tysons Corner, Virginia, U.S.
- Coordinates: 38.925834°N 77.234824°W
- Members: 16,500 (2016)
- Chairman: Tom Castriota
- Vice-Chair: Rob Cochran
- President & CEO: Mike Stanton
- Subsidiaries: NADA PAC _{(527)}, NADA Employee Health Benefit Plan _{(501(c)(9))}, NADA Services Corporation, NADA Retirement Administrators Inc., NAISA
- Employees: 165 (2017)
- Website: www.nada.org

The National Automobile Dealers Association (NADA) is an American trade organization representing nearly 16,500 franchised new car and truck dealerships, both domestic and foreign. Established in 1917, the organization is based in Tysons Corner, Virginia. As the automotive retail industry's primary trade association, NADA monitors federal legislation and regulation affecting dealerships and publishes forecasts and reports about industry trends. American Truck Dealers, established in 1970, is a division of NADA representing nearly 1,800 heavy- and medium-duty truck dealerships throughout the United States.

== Overview ==
NADA represents nearly 16,500 new car and truck dealerships, with both domestic and international franchises in the United States. The organization serves dealers by regularly representing dealerships before Congress and other federal government agencies. NADA monitors federal legislation affecting dealership operations and vehicle sales, including taxes, trade agreements, automobile and highway safety, and environmental regulations such as fuel efficiency and emissions, and publishes forecasts and reports about industry trends. In addition, to further consumer education regarding vehicle financing, NADA is a supporter of Americans Well-informed on Automobile Retailing Economics (AWARE), which was established in 2005. NADA and its political action committee, NADA PAC (formerly the Dealers Election Action Committee), are headquartered in Tysons, Virginia, and Washington, D.C., respectively.

Mike Stanton became NADA's president and chief executive officer on January 1, 2021. Florida dealer Tom Castriota began serving as the association's chairman in January 2025.

=== American Truck Dealers ===
American Truck Dealers (ATD), a division of NADA established in 1970, represents 1,800 heavy- and medium-duty truck dealerships throughout the United States. ATD members receive full services from NADA. The division's board of directors selects a new chairman every two years.

=== NADA Show ===
NADA held its first convention in Chicago in 1918, and has hosted an annual convention for more than 40 years. NADA also presents yearly automotive forums in Los Angeles and New York. Historically, the convention has attracted important guests, including Lyndon B. Johnson (1962), Ronald Reagan (1968), Henry Ford II (1977), Lee Iacocca (1990), Ross Perot (1994), Robert James Eaton (1998), Maya Angelou (1999), George H. W. Bush and Bill Clinton in 2009, and George W. Bush in 2012. In January 2014, Hillary Clinton delivered a keynote address at NADA's convention in New Orleans; she received a fee of $325,000 and the appearance received media coverage subsequently due to interest in her paid speeches following her resignation as Secretary of State and prior to beginning her presidential election campaign. Formerly called the NADA Convention and Expo, the event is currently known as the NADA Show.

== History ==
In May 1917, a group of around 30 automobile dealers in Chicago met and formed an association in Washington, D.C., following a proposed 5-percent federal luxury tax increase on all vehicles. Their goal was to convince members of Congress that automobiles were "mass consumers goods", not luxury items, and therefore automobiles contributed to the health of the U.S. economy. They successfully persuaded Congress to reduce a proposed luxury tax to 3 percent from 5 percent, and they prevented vehicle manufacturing facilities from being converted to defense factories during World War I.

Recognizing the need for ongoing representation, in July 1917, 130 industry leaders gathered in Chicago and elected Milwaukee dealer George Browne the organization's first president. Members focused on membership growth and distributed invitations to around 100 vehicle manufacturers. The first NADA-sponsored federal legislation, known as the National Motor Vehicle Theft Law, passed in 1919, which made motor vehicle theft involving the crossing of state borders a federal crime. NADA also advocated for automobile finance reforms.

NADA began studying used car values in 1922. In 1928, the association's fixed amount membership dues were converted to a sliding scale based on the dealership's gross sales from the preceding year. However, members were still unable to afford dues, and by 1932 the Great Depression had nearly caused NADA to fail. The organization's leadership took measures to save costs, which included relocating the organization's headquarters to reduce rent expenditures. In 1933, NADA published its first "Official Used Car Guide", providing used car values for 21 regions of the United States to 40,000 subscribers. NADA's membership was 30,000 by 1934. During Prohibition, the association advocated on behalf of dealers who were affected by vehicle repossessions of violators of liquor laws, and in the mid-1930s, NADA established a standard for appraising used cars, and NADA began educating dealers about the sale of used cars.

During World War II, NADA worked to reduce rationing and helped recruit mechanics. The association's 1943 convention was canceled because of a temporary ban on gatherings of 50 or more people. NADA was unable to hold large meetings until the 1947 conference in Atlantic City, New Jersey, where 6,500 attendees represented 32,000 member dealers. During the Korean War, NADA fought against price controls and a 7-percent excise tax on new vehicles. In an effort to improve the public perception of dealers, NADA initiated a campaign encouraging dealers to adopt ethical codes during the 1950s.

Ground broke on the NADA Automotive Education Center, on the Northwood University campus in Midland, Michigan, in October 1971. The center, which was dedicated on May 18, 1973, was funded by NADA members and features a hotel, offices, classrooms, a kitchen, dining facilities, and is used as a primary meeting and community space on campus. The Ford Courtyard and Commons were dedicated in October 1996 and October 2004, respectively.

In mid-2009, NADA, Chrysler, and General Motors dealers worked to prevent dealerships from closing as the result of the automotive industry crisis of 2008–10; the association purchased advertisements in major publications asking President Barack Obama "to choose Main Street over Wall Street". In September, the association and the U.S. Chamber of Commerce requested a review of the Environmental Protection Agency's waiver permitting California to regulate tailpipe emissions. NADA spearheaded a grassroots campaign in 2010 to support the Campbell Amendment, which would make automobile dealers exempt from the Consumer Protection Agency. Dealership in 2009 were facing closure of its company in many different states, they even consider moving their headquarters from downtown Detroit. Their main focus was to try and used different ways to avoid closure. The National Dealers Association look at the crisis from the 1970s to see what effects it had on the car business.

In mid-2015, NADA sold its 82-year-old Used Car Guide business to J.D. Power and Associates. In January 2017, NADA launched an information website to educate the public about the role of car dealers and to describe their economic impact.

== Charitable activities ==
The NADA Foundation (formerly the National Automobile Dealers Charitable Foundation) was established in 1975. Former NADA President Bob Mallon, a Ford dealer from Tacoma, Washington, is credited with creating the organization, which has contributed more than $13 million to educational, emergency relief, and health care programs throughout the United States. The foundation's Emergency Relief Fund, which supports dealership employees after disasters, has donated more than $5 million to nearly 8,700 individuals since 1992. The foundation's Frank E. McCarthy Memorial Fund partners with Canine Companions for Independence to provide assistance dogs to veterans and children with disabilities. Since its inception, the fund has contributed $250,000 and placed 25 dogs. The Joseph J. Sanchez Memorial Fund donates $7,000 annually to students at four educational institutions, and the Survivors Relief Fund has contributed around $800,000 in scholarships to more than 100 students who are victims of the September 11 attacks. The NADA Foundation has also donated over 4,800 CPR training units.
