= Ashfield, New South Wales =

Suburb of Sydney, New South Wales, Australia

Ashfield
- Suburb
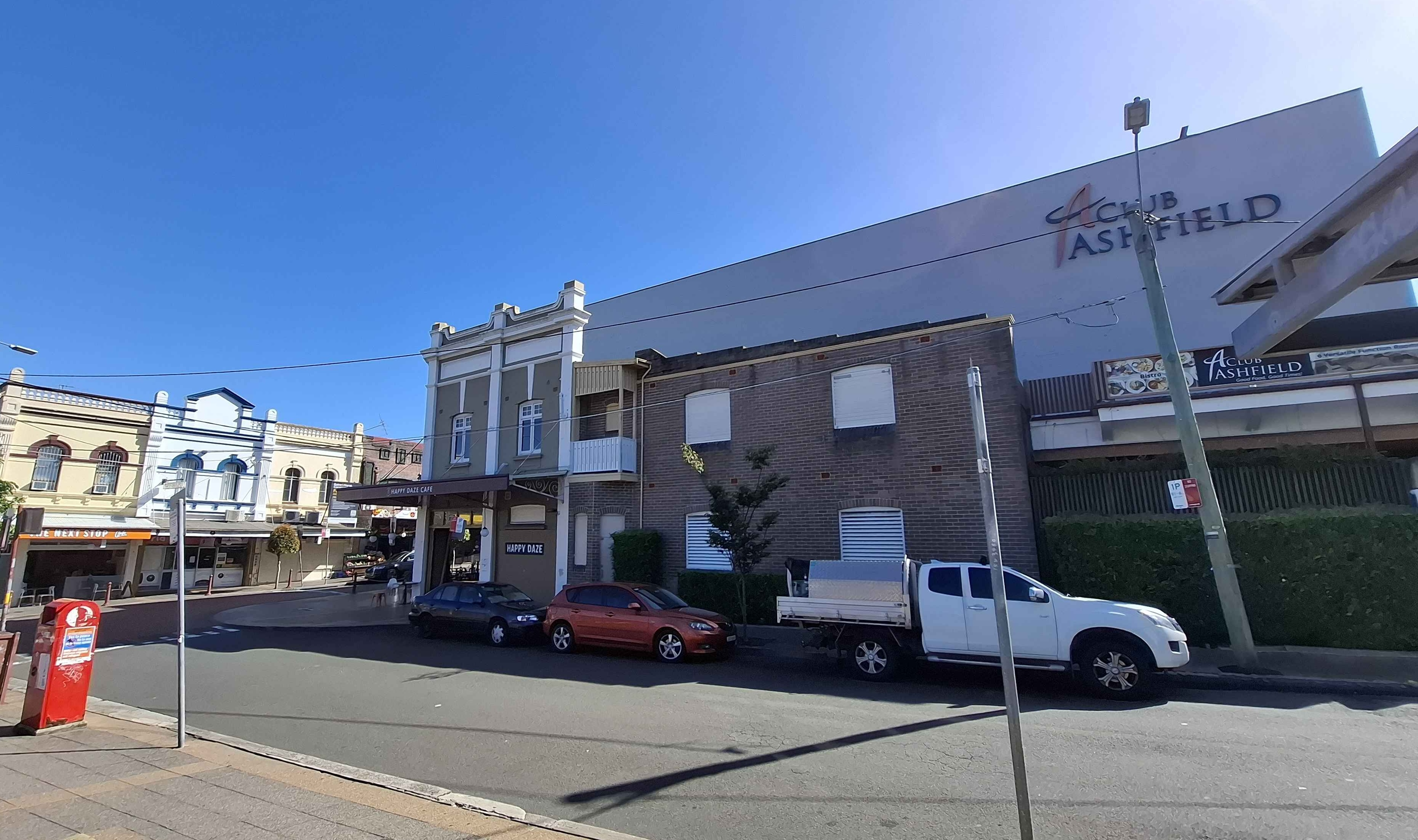
- Charlotte Street, Ashfield pictured in March 2026

- Interactive map of Ashfield
- Coordinates: 33°53′20″S 151°07′30″E
- Country: Australia
- State: New South Wales
- City: Sydney
- LGA: Inner West Council
- Location: 8 km (5.0 mi) west of Sydney central business district
- Established: 1838

Government
  - State electorates: Strathfield; Summer Hill
  - Federal divisions: Grayndler; Reid

Area
  - Total: 3.41 km^{2} (1.32 sq mi)
- Elevation: 34 m (112 ft)

Population
  - Total: 23,012 (2021 census)
  - Density: 6,748/km^{2} (17,478/sq mi)
- Postcode: 2131
Suburbs around Ashfield
Croydon	Five Dock	Haberfield
Croydon Park	Ashfield	Summer Hill
Ashbury	Hurlstone Park	Dulwich Hill

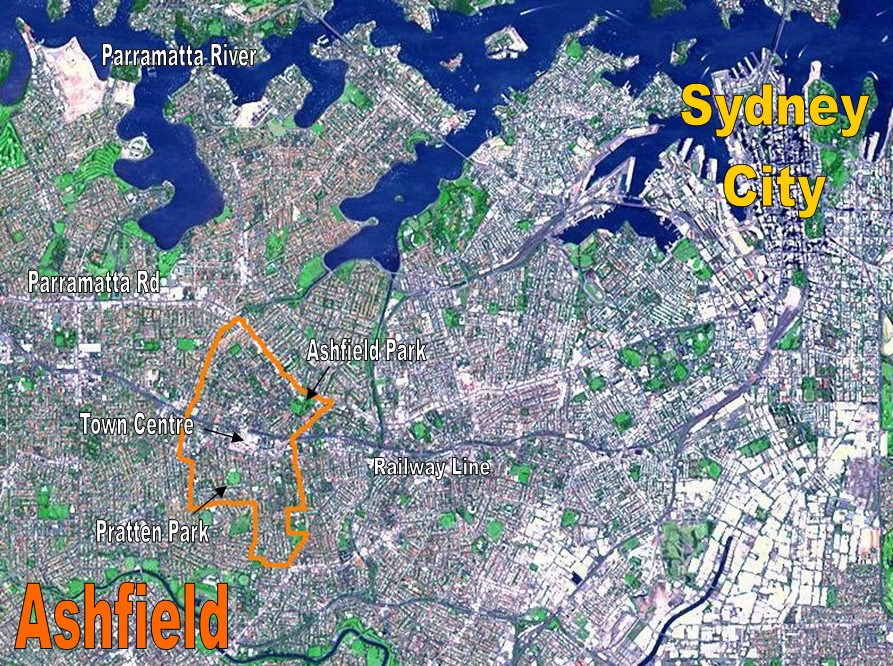
NASA image of Sydney's CBD and inner west suburbs, with borders of Ashfield shown in orange

Ashfield is a suburb in the Inner West of Sydney, New South Wales, Australia. Ashfield is about eight kilometres west of the Sydney central business district.

Ashfield's population is highly multicultural with the majority of the area's dwellings being a mixture of mainly post-war low-rise flats (apartment blocks) and Federation-era detached houses. Amongst these are a number of grand Victorian buildings that offer a hint of Ashfield's rich cultural heritage.

== History ==
=== Aboriginal people ===
Before the arrival of the British, the area now known as Ashfield was inhabited by the Wangal people. Wangal country was believed to be centred on modern-day Concord and stretched east to the swampland of Long Cove Creek (now known as Hawthorne Canal). The land was heavily wooded at the time with tall eucalypts covering the higher ground and a variety of swampy trees along Iron Cove Creek. The people hunted native animals and fish. The arrival of the First Fleet in 1788 had a devastating effect on the local people, mainly from the introduction of smallpox, to which the indigenous people had little resistance.

=== Early British settlement ===
By 1790, a rough track had been built between the colony's two settlements at Sydney Cove and Parramatta. This route later became the main artery of the expanding Greater Sydney and, as the northern boundary of what is now Ashfield, dictated early British settlement in the area. The first land grant in the area was made to Rev Richard Johnson in 1793 and all of it had been granted by 1810. By the 1820s, all the grants had been amalgamated into two large estates: Ashfield Park (the northern half between Liverpool Road, and Parramatta Road) and Canterbury Estate (the area south of Liverpool Road). Ashfield Park was named by Robert Campbell, whose father was the laird of Ashfield in Scotland.

=== Population growth ===
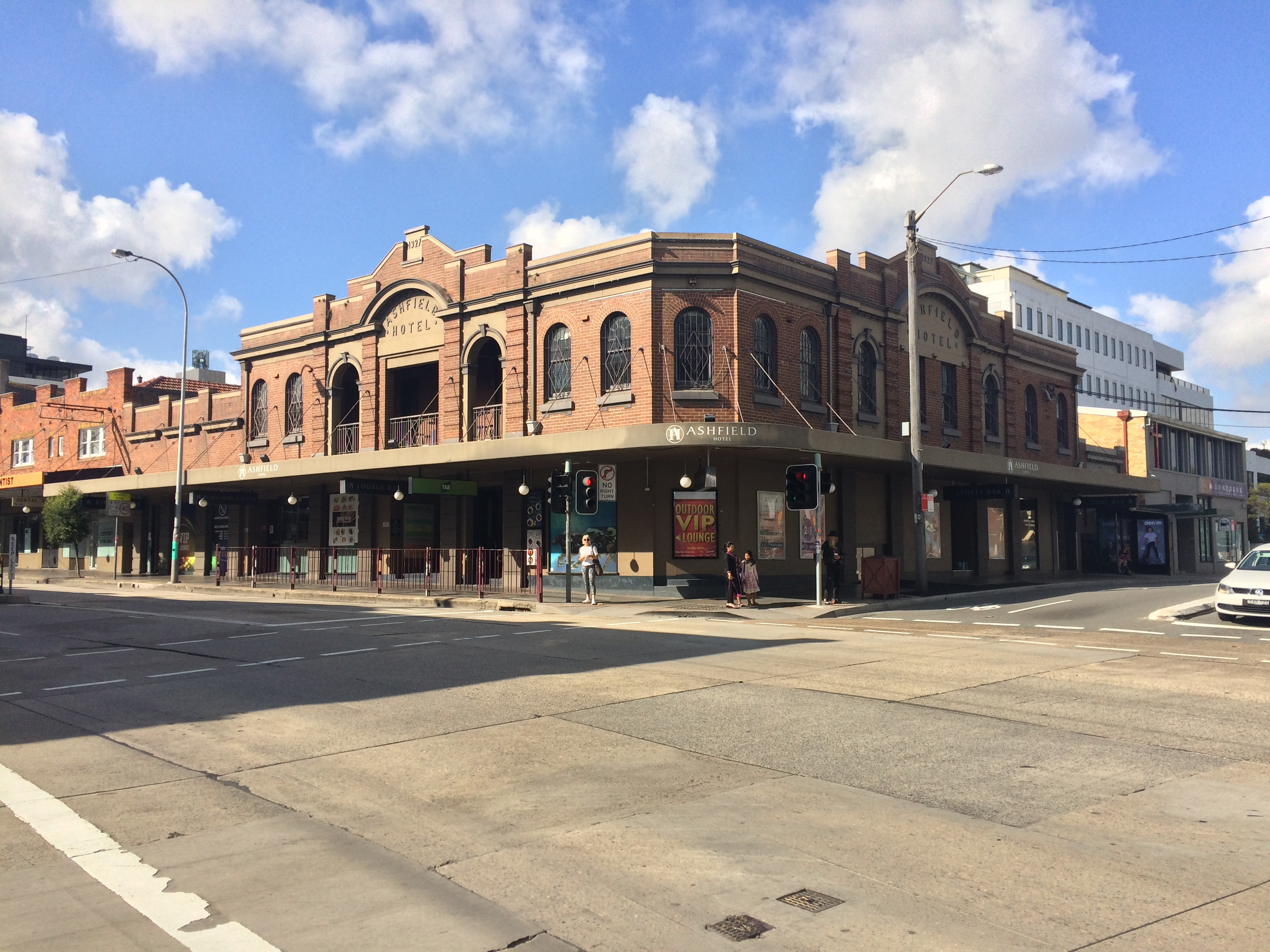
Ashfield Hotel, from Liverpool Road and Holden Street that was made to accommodate the growing population of the surrounding area

In 1838, Elizabeth Underwood, then owner of Ashfield Park, subdivided part of her land to form the village of Ashfield between Liverpool Road and Alt Street. Part of the subdivision was the building of St John's Church in Alt Street in 1841, now the suburb's oldest surviving building. By 1855, the village had about 70 houses and 200 residents. However, the opening of the Sydney-Parramatta railway line that year, with Ashfield as one of its six original stations, led to a population explosion. In 1872, there were enough residents for the area to be granted a municipal council. By 1890, the population had grown to 11,000.

During this time, Ashfield was seen as a highly desirable location compared to the city, which had become crowded and pestilent. Many grand Victorian houses were built in the latter part of the 19th century. But by the time of World War I, the suburb had fallen out of favour and the rich residents had mostly headed for the North Shore. Many of the grand homes were knocked down in the 1920s and 1930s and replaced with small art deco blocks of flats or semi-detached houses. A few remain, however, and are listed in the Landmarks section.

By the 1950s, the population of Ashfield had begun to fall, as it had in many surrounding suburbs, as people moved to newer houses on larger blocks of land on the urban fringe. The Council's response was to start approving large blocks of flats, many of which were built during the 1960s and 1970s but which also continue to be built today. There is, however, recognition of the area's heritage with many buildings in the suburb protected by heritage orders.

=== Industrial history ===
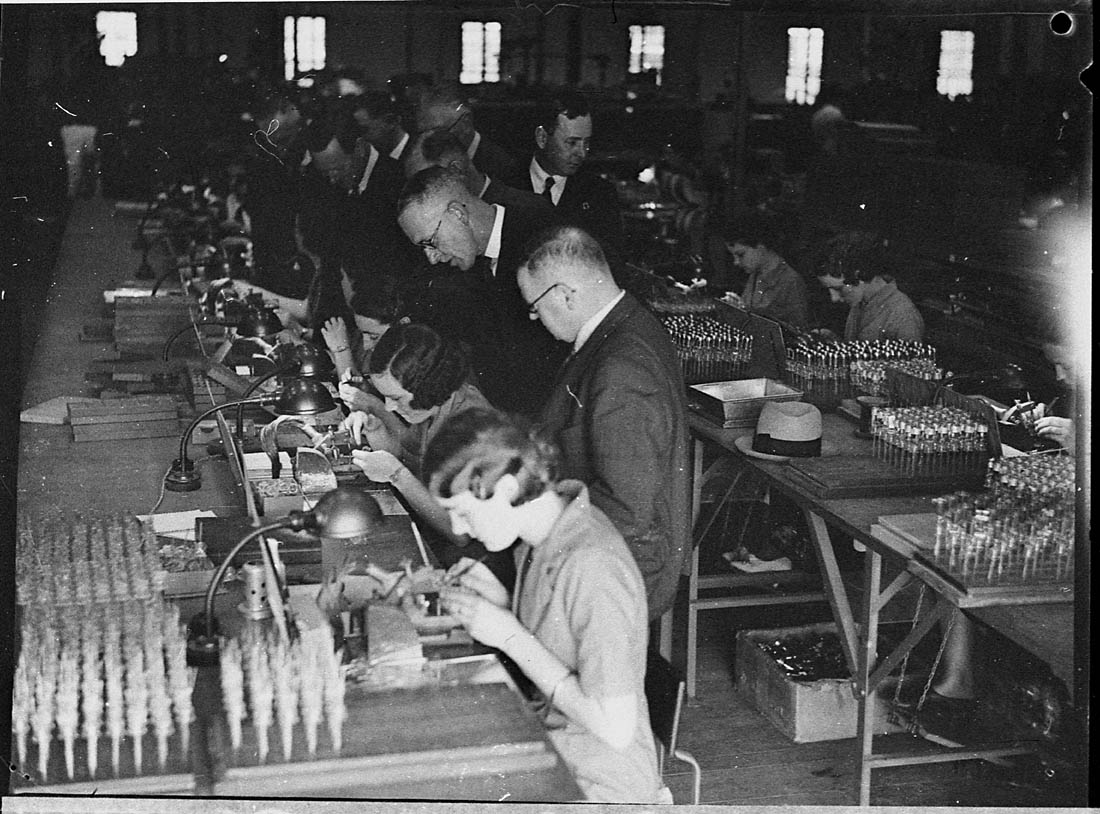
Workers in the old AWA factory in 1936

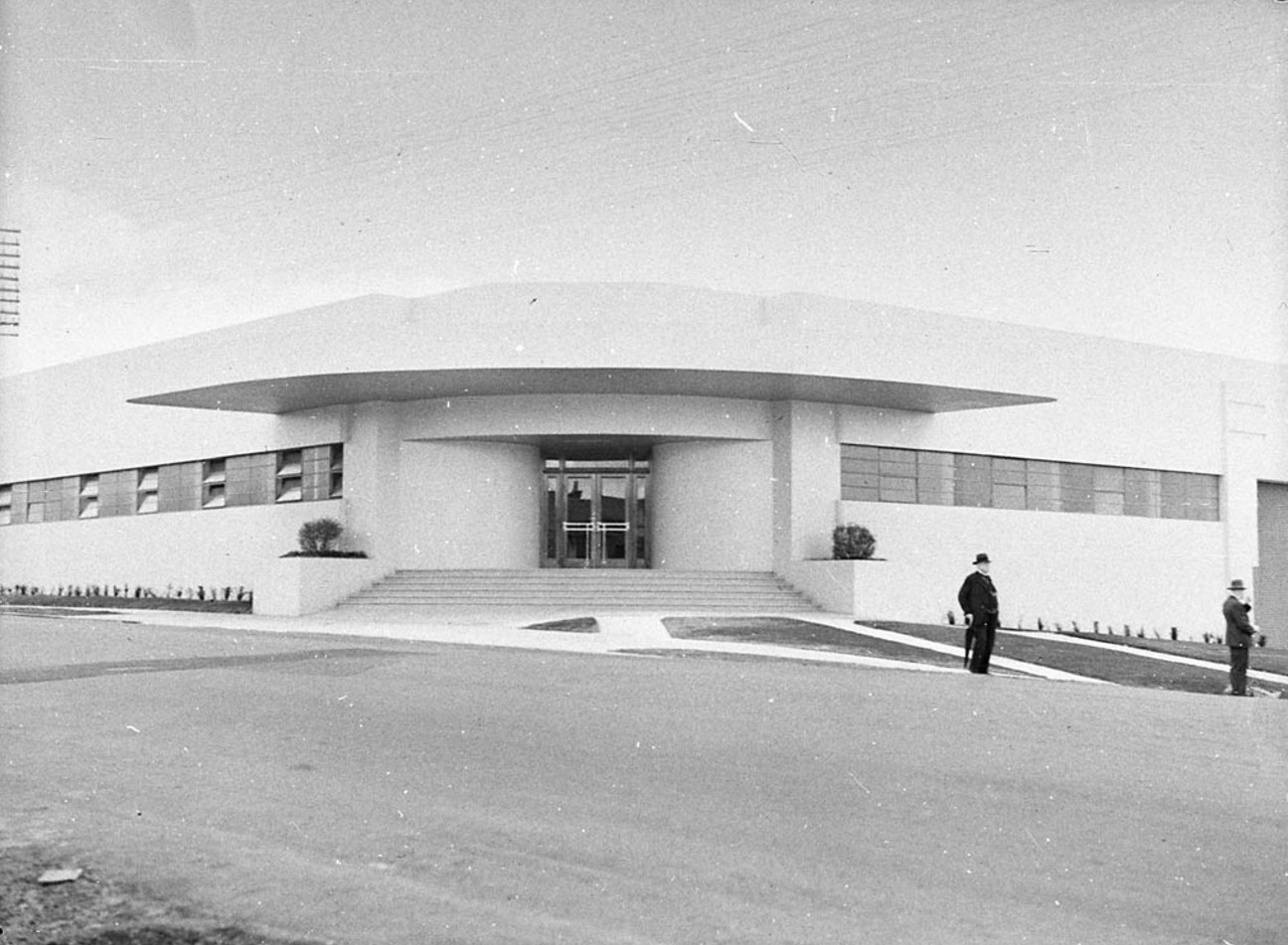
Peek Freans American biscuit factory (1937) corner Frederick Street and Parramatta Road

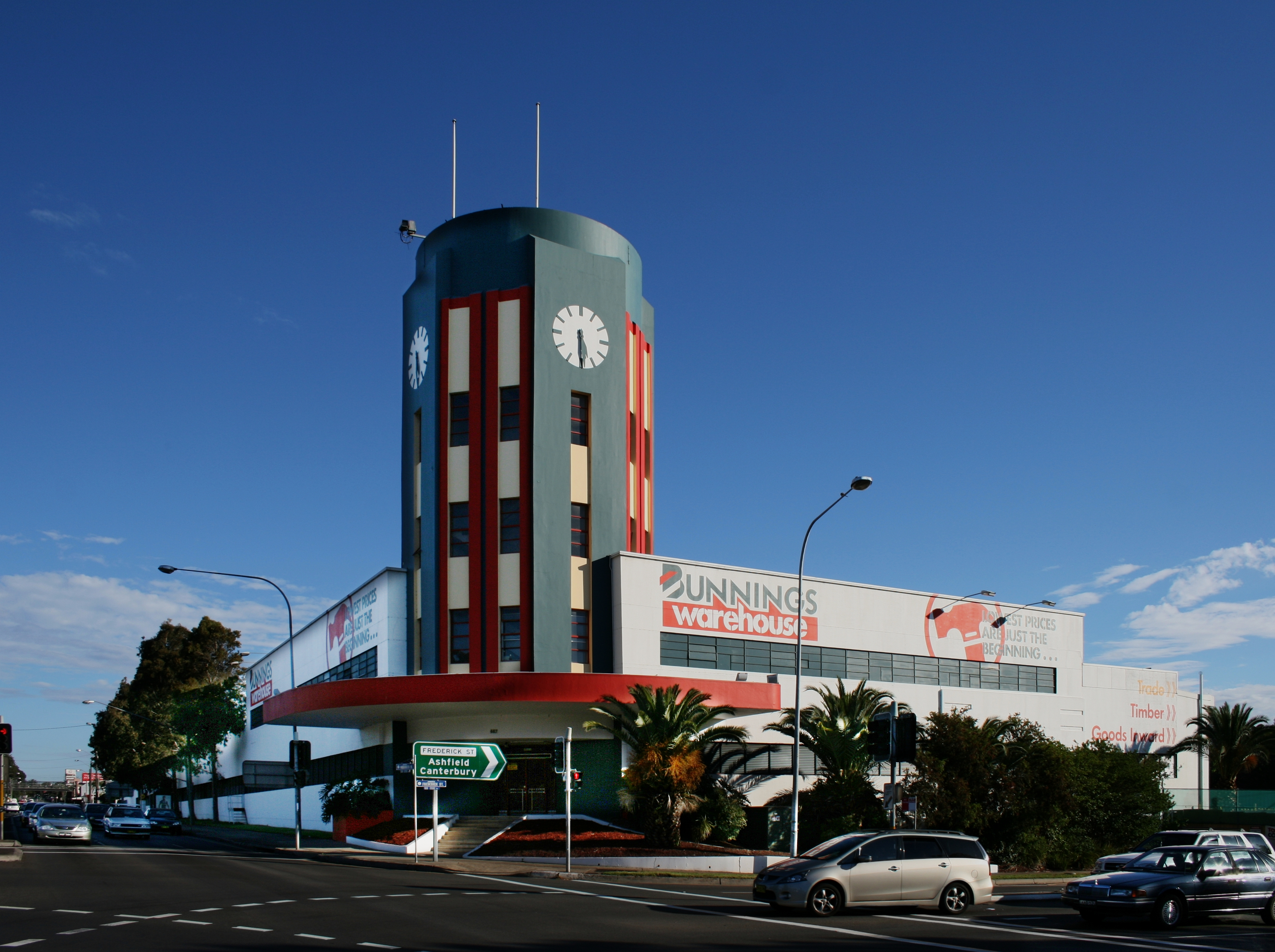
Former Peek Freans biscuit factory, now a Bunnings warehouse (2009)

While never a noted industrial suburb, Ashfield has had a couple of significant industries. On Parramatta Road near Frederick Street was the Australian Six motor car factory which opened in 1920. The site later became an AWA factory producing radio valves and other components. The site has since been turned into a commercial and residential development. On the other side of Frederick Street was the Peek Freans biscuit factory, the tower of which was (and still is) a familiar site to passing motorists on Parramatta Road. However, this factory is also no longer industrial, serving today as a large Bunnings warehouse.

== Commercial area ==
The main shopping precinct is located along Liverpool Road south of Ashfield railway station. Along this strip, there are a few medium-sized office blocks, many street-level shops and Ashfield Mall, a shopping centre containing supermarkets, a discount department store and specialty shops. This commercial area also extends into Charlotte Street and Elizabeth Street on the northern side of the station. A second commercial precinct is located along Parramatta Road consisting mostly of automotive-related retail and light industry.

== Transport ==
Ashfield is located at the intersection of two major roads. Parramatta Road runs from Sydney city to Parramatta and ultimately continues on as the Great Western Highway through Penrith and the Blue Mountains. Liverpool Road runs from Parramatta Road at Ashfield to Liverpool and ultimately continues on as the Hume Highway. While completion of the Sydney Orbital Network has bypassed these two roads somewhat, they remain busy and well connected to all parts of Sydney. Another major road is Frederick/Milton Street which connects the City West Link Road at Haberfield with Georges River Road at Croydon Park.

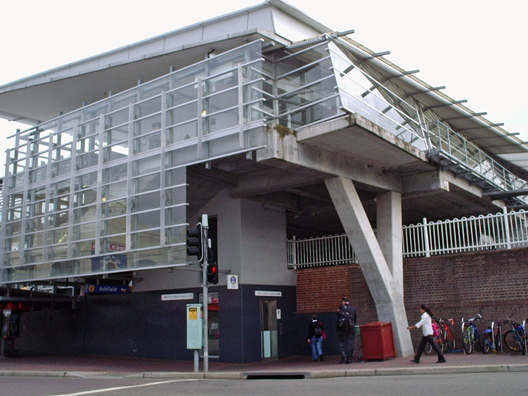
Ashfield railway station

Ashfield railway station is on the Main Suburban railway line of the Sydney Trains network. Ashfield was opened in 1855 as part of the original Sydney to Parramatta railway. It was renovated in 2002. There are express and all stations services to the City Circle, Homebush, Parramatta, Leppington and Liverpool.

Ashfield is the terminus for one Transit Systems bus services: 464 (to Mortlake, via Croydon Park, Burwood, and Concord). Another nine routes pass through Ashfield: 406 (to Five Dock and Hurlstone Park), 413 (City to Campsie), 418 (to Burwood and Sydenham station, and Tempe), 461X (City to Burwood), 490 & 492 (Drummoyne to Rockdale and Hurstville), 491 (Five Dock to Hurstville) and 480 & 483 (City to Strathfield).

There are virtually no dedicated bicycle paths in the suburb of Ashfield but there is a local bicycle users group which has worked with the then Ashfield Municipal Council to identify preferred routes through Ashfield for cyclists. The Strathfield-Newtown route is the most important of these, passing down Park Lane and Robert Street towards Summer Hill where it links with the Cooks River to Iron Cove Greenway Corridor providing access to those two popular local cycleways.

== Education ==
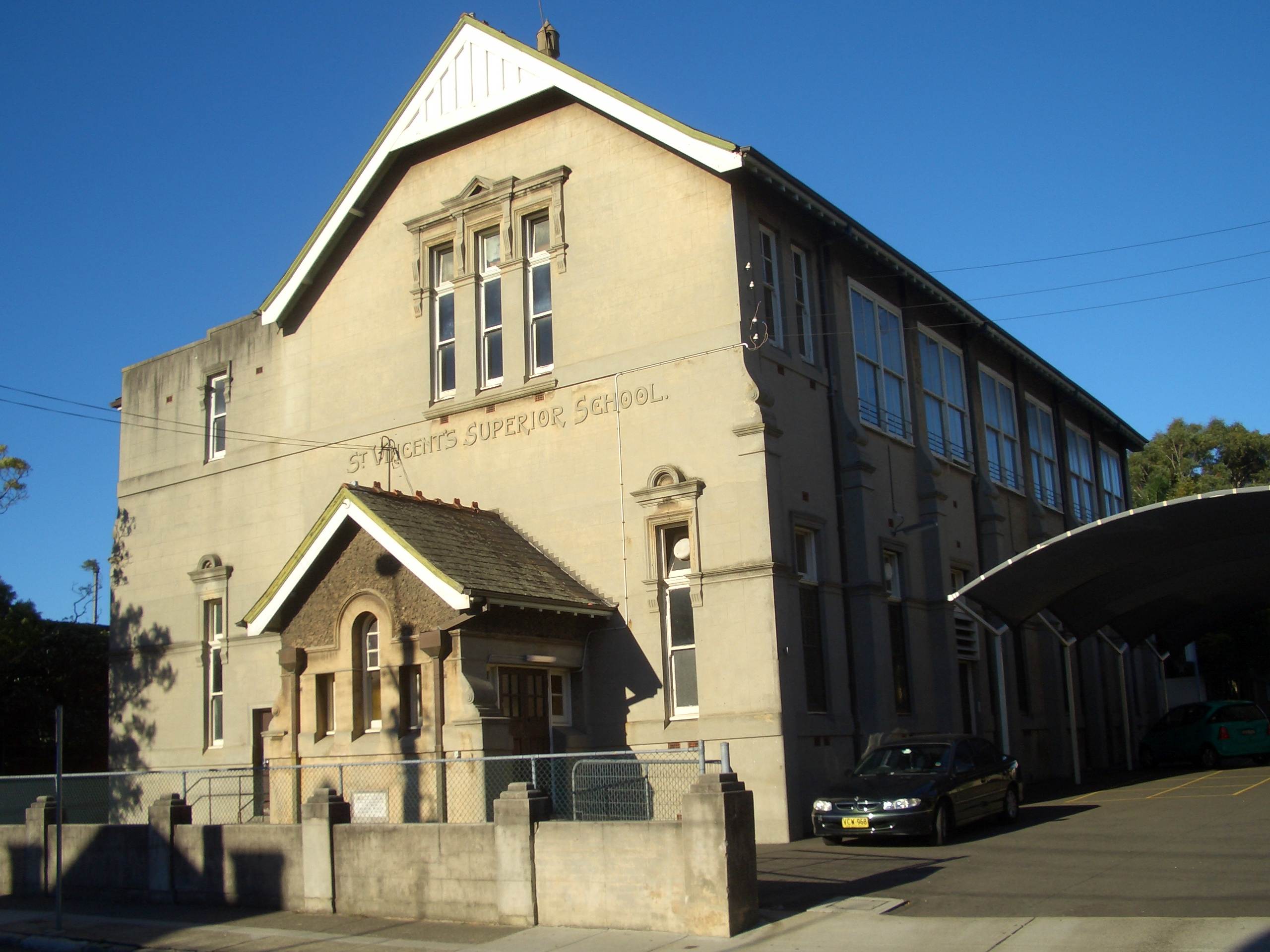
St Vincent's Primary School

Ashfield has two primary schools: Ashfield Public (on Liverpool Road) and Yeo Park Infants (on Victoria Street at the southern extremity of the suburb). It also has three high schools: Ashfield Boys High School (next to Ashfield Public on Liverpool Road) and De La Salle (a Catholic boys school in Bland Street, and Betlhem College (a Catholic girls school) right next to it

Ashfield Public is the oldest of these having been established in 1876 after much lobbying from local residents. Prior to that there had been schools operating out of the Methodist, Anglican and Presbyterian churches and there had even been a public school operating briefly out of the Methodist church between 1862 and 1866 but it wasn't until 1876 that it became a permanent fixture. In 1907, two years of secondary school were added and the school became a Superior School but it was not until 1965 that Ashfield Boys High was formally established and separated from the primary school.

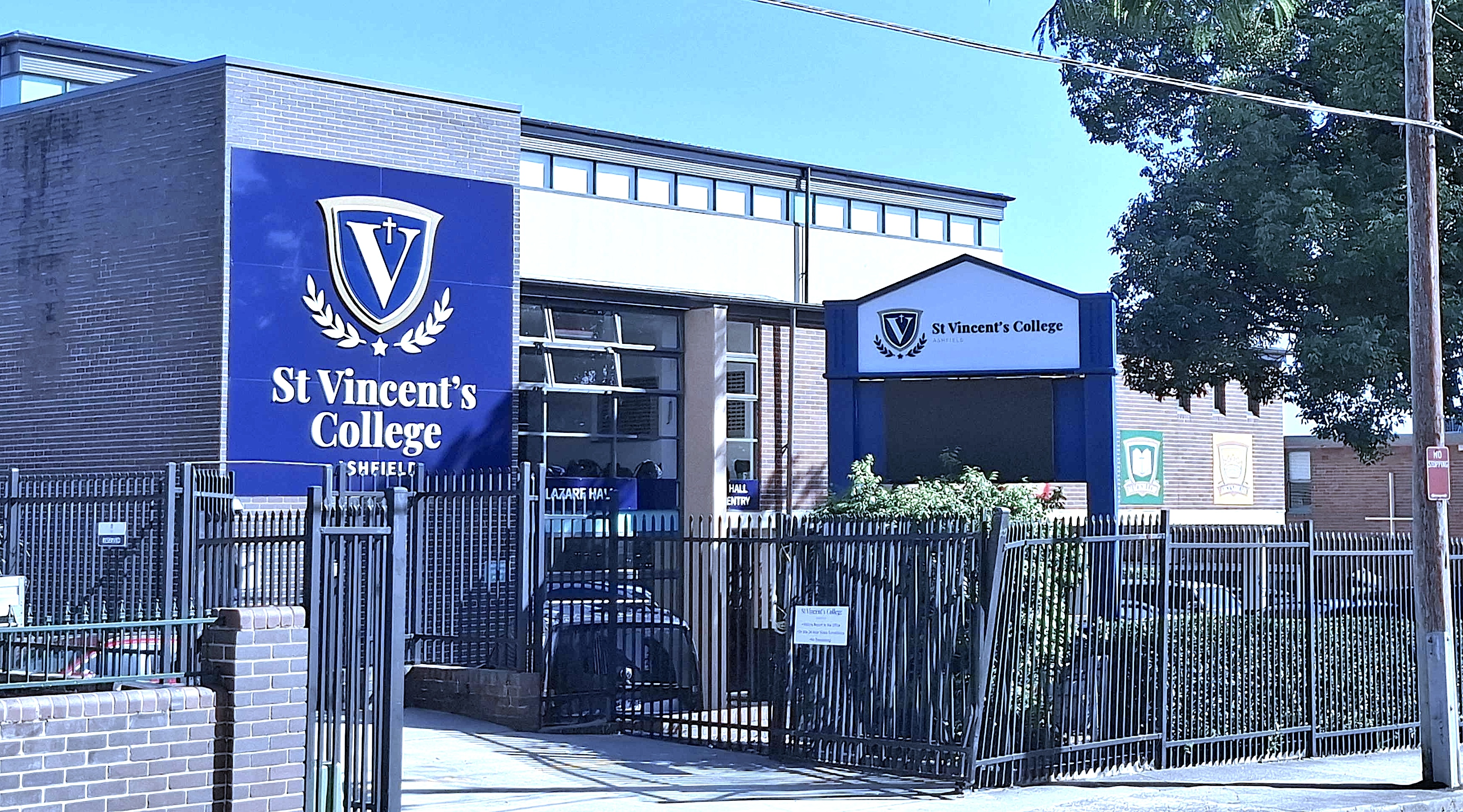
Bland St exit of St Vincent's College Ashfield, pictured in March 2026

Bethlehem was the first high school in the area, established by the Sisters of Charity in 1881. It led to a Catholic primary school St Charles being established shortly after. When it burnt down in 1904, St Vincents became the replacement, taking on the name of the newly built church next door. The De La Salle school was established in 1915.

The year after Bethlehem was established, an Anglican girls boarding school called Normanhurst School was started in Bland Street. It moved to Orpington Street in 1888 where it remained until closure in 1941. It produced notable students including Pamela Travers (author of Mary Poppins) and tennis champion Daphne Akhurst. There were a number of other private schools in the area during this period as well but none survived to the present day.

== Health ==
There are no public hospitals in Ashfield although there are two private facilities. The Sydney Private Hospital on the corner of Victoria Street and Robert Street first opened in 1931 as the Masonic Hospital. It did at one point have an Accident and Emergency Unit, an Intensive Care Unit, and a Maternity Unit. All of these were closed down in 2000 when the hospital changed ownership. It now focuses on elective surgery. The Wesley Private Hospital in Frederick Street is a well-established mental health facility.

== Landmarks ==
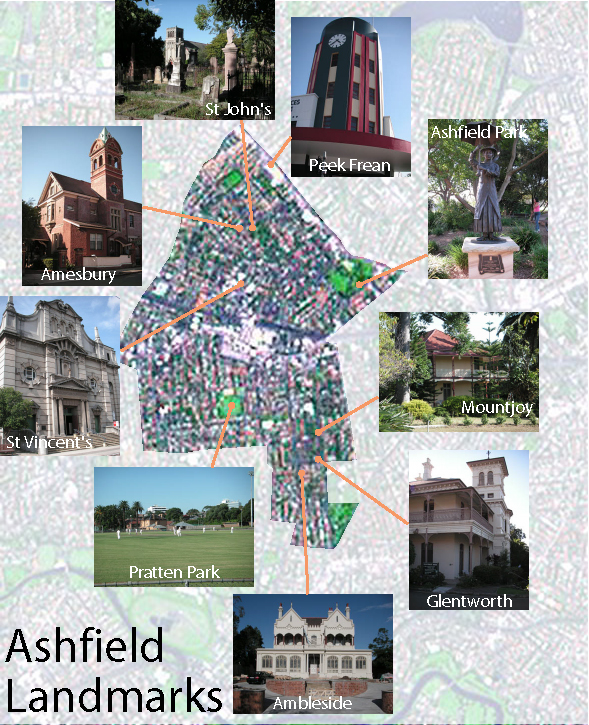
Location map of selected Ashfield landmarks

For visitors passing through Ashfield along Parramatta Road, Liverpool Road or the railway line, the three main landmarks that stand out are the tower of the old Peek Frean Biscuit factory (now Bunnings Warehouse) on Parramatta Road, Wests Leagues Club on Liverpool Road next to the railway line and the Ashfield water reservoir in Holden Street to the south of the town centre. The water tower was built in 1912 and provides the water supply for the surrounding areas.

=== Houses ===
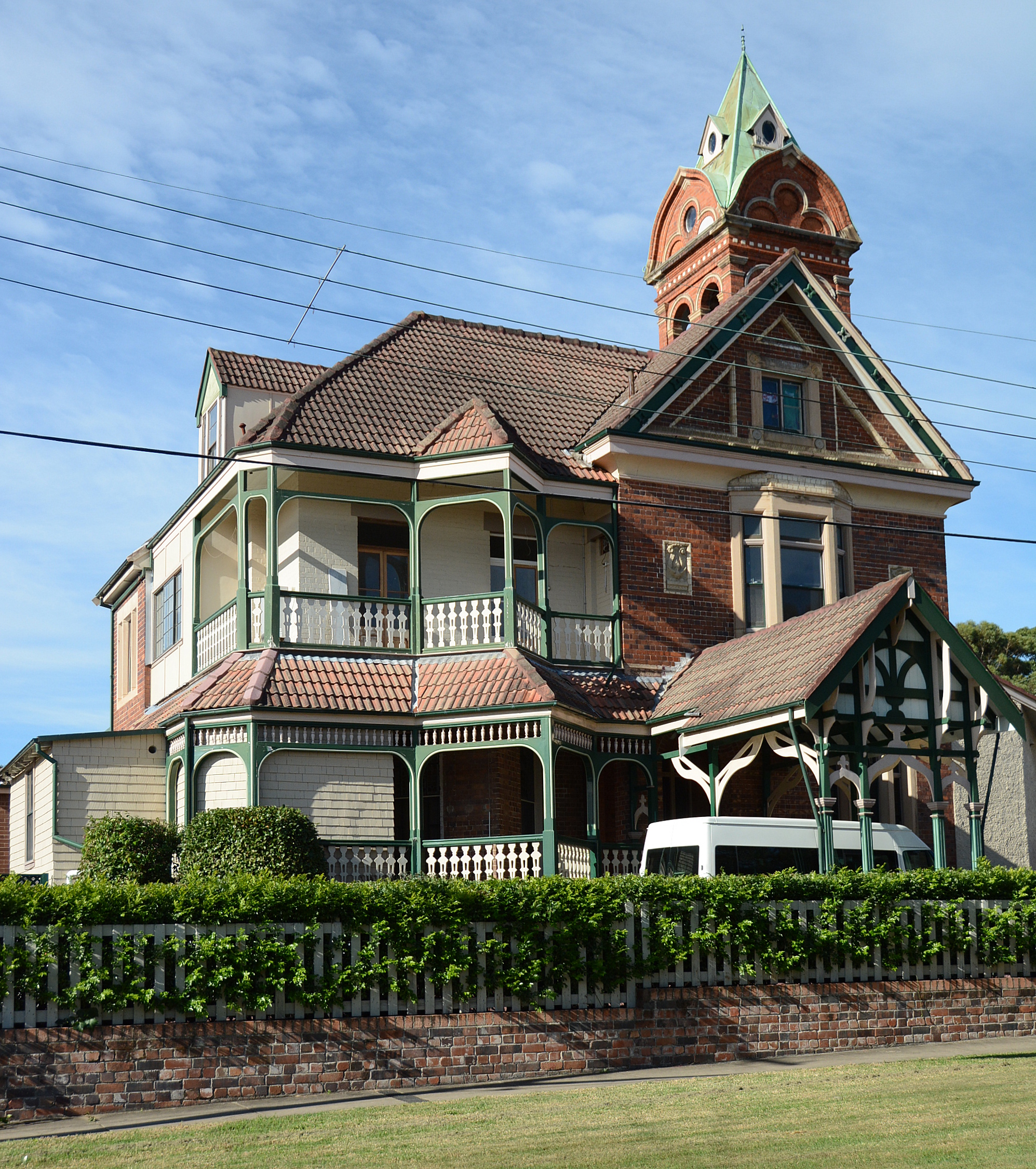
Amesbury, the heritage-listed home of Norman Selfe

Ashfield Council produced a number of guides for heritage walks in the area, but these guides are not being printed anymore. Some of the important heritage buildings in Ashfield, from Ashfield Council's heritage guide, are found in the section below. The Inner West Council does not currently have any guides for the Ashfield area although they do have heritage guides for Balmain and Leichhardt.

To the south of the town centre are Plynlimmon (built 1867) in Norton St and now a child care centre; Glenore (built 1897) and Buninyong (built 1901), two adjacent properties in Tintern Road; Mountjoy (built 1870) now part of the hospital in Victoria Street; Glentworth (built 1887) also in Victoria Street and now part of a retirement village; Ashfield Castle (built 1887) in Queen Street and originally known as Ambleside; Thirning Villa, (built 1868) and now part of Pratten Park; Gallop House in Arthur Street, now part of a nursing home; and Milton in Blackwood Avenue, which was built in the 1850s and was once home to NSW Premier Sir Henry Parkes. North of the railway line are Pittwood in Charlotte Street, formerly part of a nursing home but now used by Sydney Missionary and Bible College; the impressive tower of Amesbury (built 1888) in Alt Street; nearby Taringa in Taringa Street; and Gorton in Henry Street, which was built in 1860 and since 1876 has been the Infants Home. On Lapish Avenue on the western end of town still stands a street scape of five Art Deco Sydney Bungalow styled semi-detached pairs and a block of units at each end that were designed and built during World War II as speculative housing the full history of the land has been meticulously research and documented.

A number of these properties are listed on the Register of the National Estate including Amesbury, Ashfield Castle, Buninyong, Glenore, Taringa and two unnamed Gothic houses at 177-179 Norton Street. Also listed on the Register are Ashfield Park (see Parks section), the police and fire station in Victoria Street, and the band rotunda in Yeo Park.

=== Churches ===
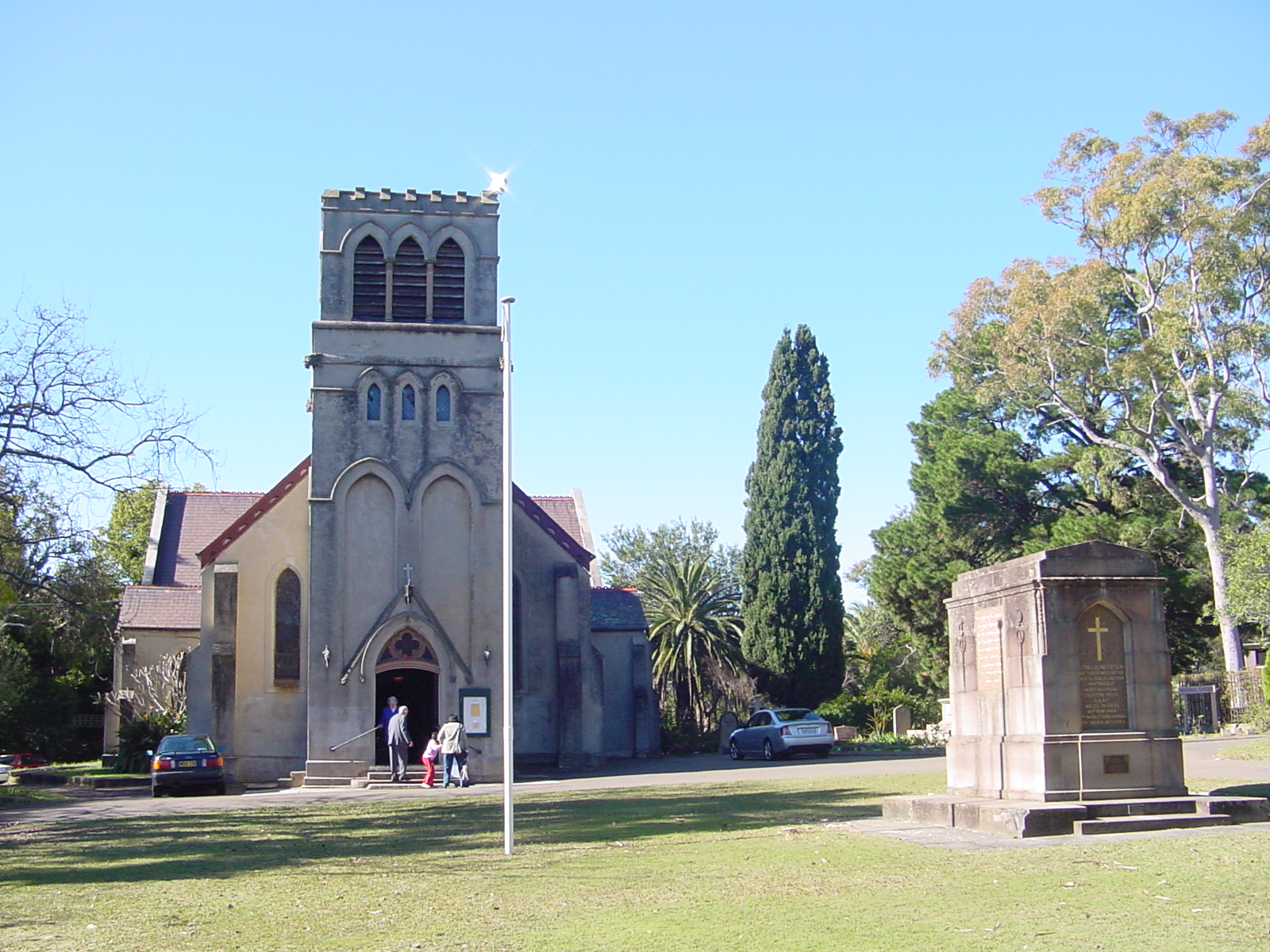
St John the Baptist's Anglican Church, Ashfield

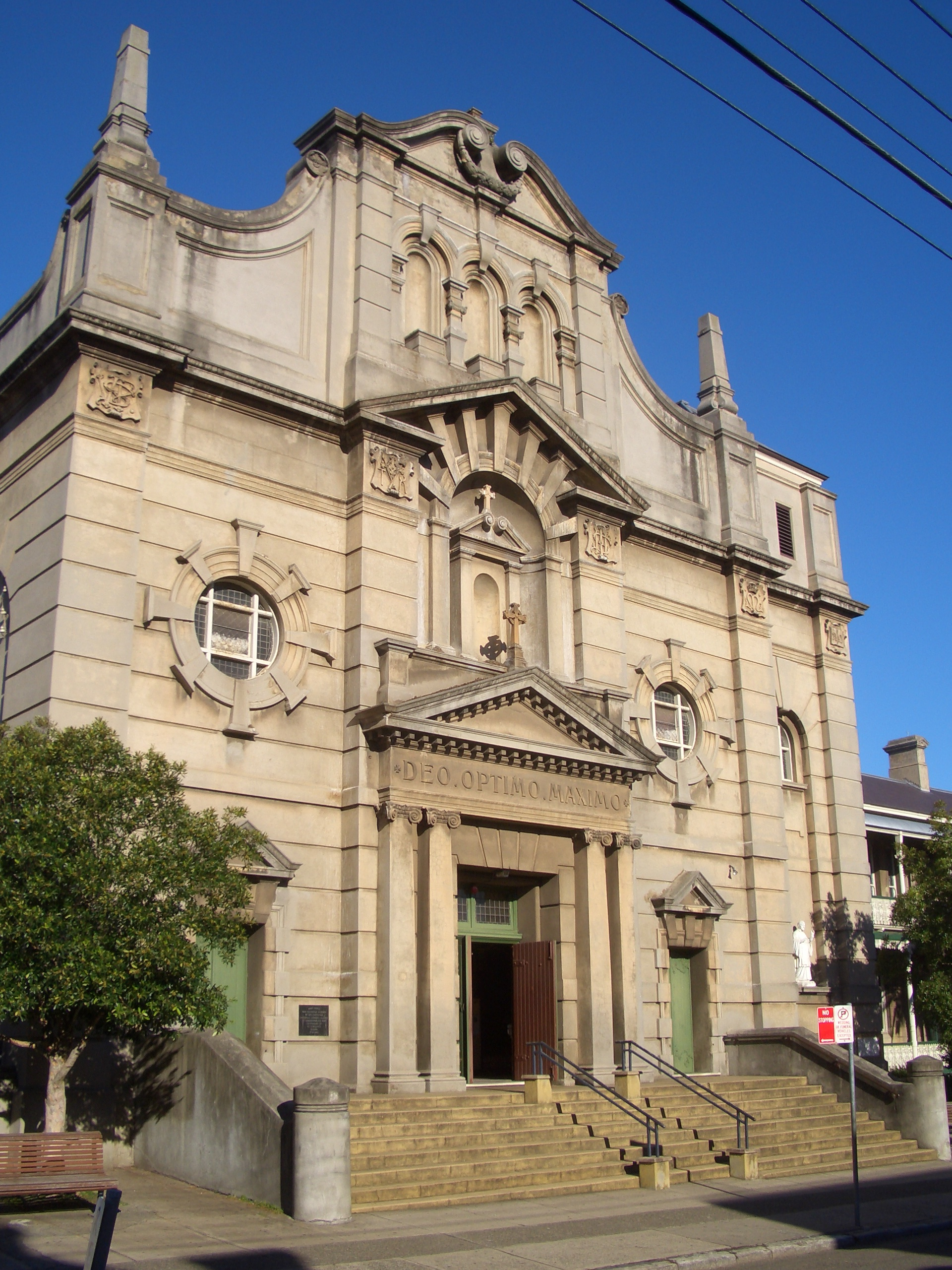
St Vincent's Roman Catholic Church

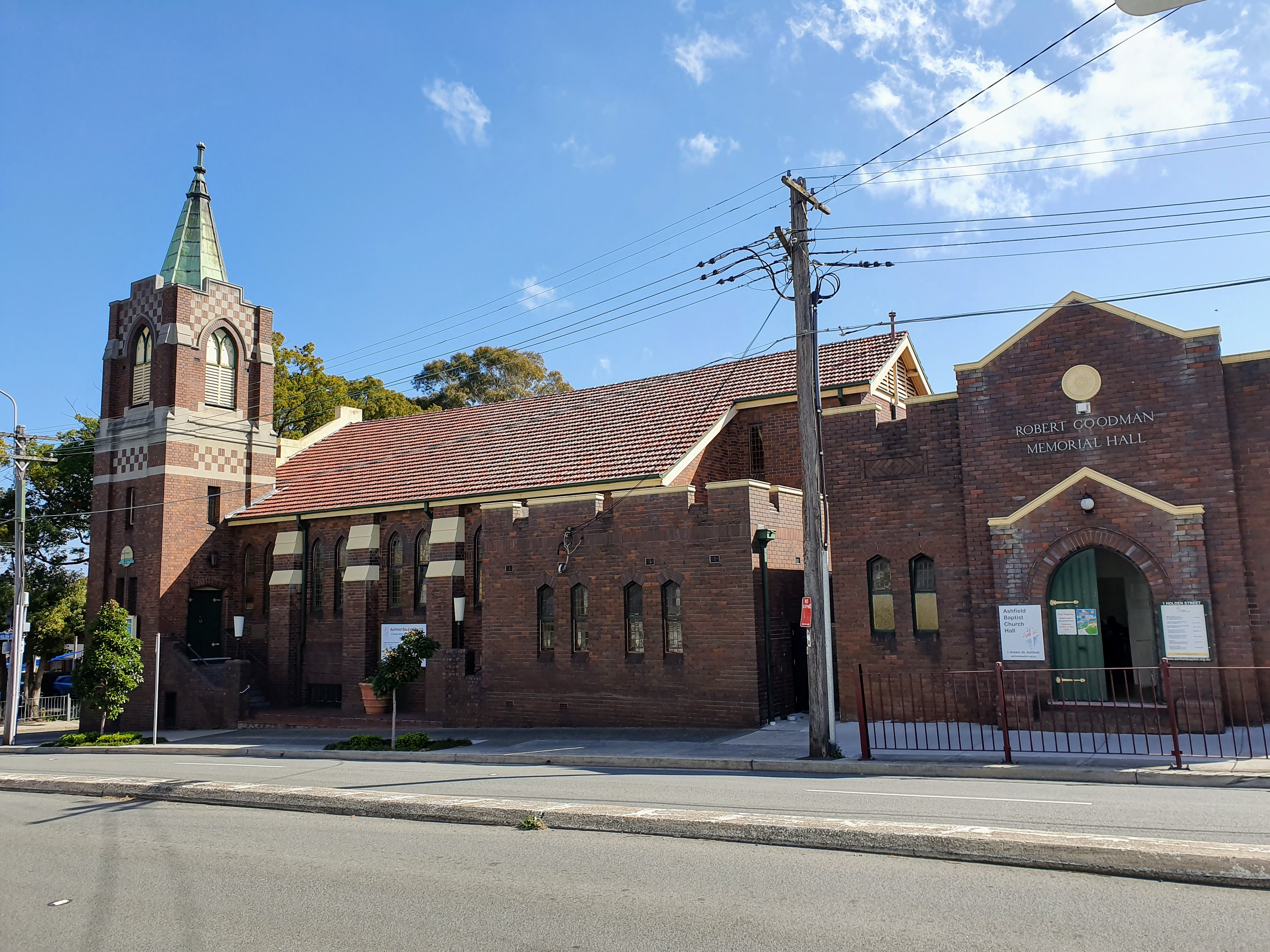
Ashfield Baptist Church

The first church in Ashfield was St. John the Baptist's Anglican Church in Alt Street. It was part of Elizabeth Underwood's 1838 subdivision that gave rise to the village of Ashfield and was reserved by her for the purpose of 'the erection of an Episcopalian Church'. Prior to then, Anglican church services had been held in her house. Work on St Johns began in 1840 and after the project was taken over by colonial architect Edmund Blacket, it was consecrated in 1845. It is the oldest surviving building in Ashfield.

In 1842, neighbouring landowner Robert Campbell made an acre of land between Liverpool Road and Norton Street available for a Methodist chapel and schoolhouse. In 1864, a larger building was erected on the site which still exists as the Ashfield Uniting Church. It is also home of the Exodus Foundation providing 400 meals a day to the needy.

The Presbyterians did not build a local church until 1876, choosing a site on the corner of Liverpool Road and Knox Street. Prior to this they attended St David's in Haberfield. Although they later built a larger church on the same Knox Street site, the original church is located at the southwestern corner of the property, having been moved twice from its original location.

Catholic services began in the area in 1880 with the establishment of Bethlehem College. Services quickly outgrew the school's small chapel and in 1894, the Vincentian Fathers started building a church in Bland Street, opposite Bethlehem. Designed by Catholic Architects Sheerin and Hennessy in a grand Romanesque style, St Vincents was completed in 1907.

The Baptists held their first service in the School of Arts building on the corner of Liverpool Road and Holden Street. After building a small church further down Holden Street in 1886, they returned to the School of Arts in 1903 which then became known as the Baptist Tabernacle. In 1937, they sold the building, which was knocked down and replaced with a cinema, and moved to their current site on the corner of Holden and Norton Streets. It is Gothic in style with a landmark tower, an impressive street facade and a sympathetically designed adjoining hall.

The Seventh-day Adventists have had a church in Ashfield for over 100 years. The church was first established from a series of camp meetings held in the area in the late 1890s. The current church is located on Charlotte Street.

=== Parks ===
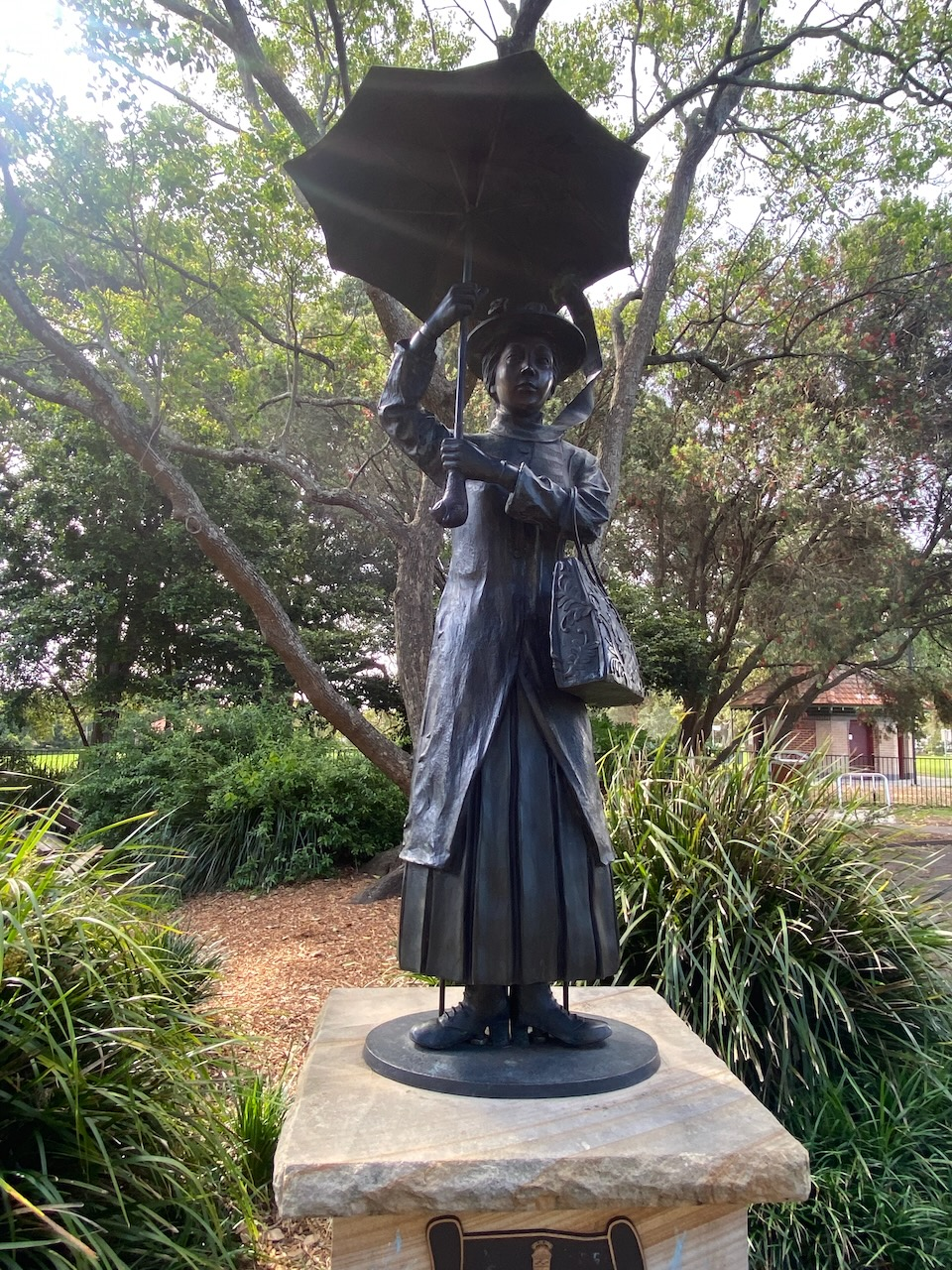
Mary Poppins statue, Ashfield Park, unveiled 2004

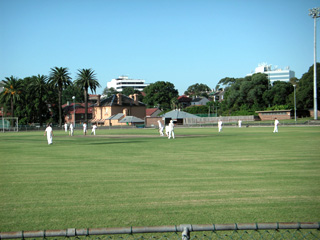
Cricket at Pratten Park with Thirning Villa on the far side of the ground and Ashfield town centre behind that.

From the late 1870s, meetings were held in Ashfield in support of a new 106-acre reserve in the district for the enjoyment of locals at a time when housing subdivision was rapidly increasing.

At the present time, with a rapidly growing population, it was excessively urgent that land should be reserved for a metropolitan park. The proposed site was only about four or five miles distant from Sydney. It was centrally situated, being surrounded, so to speak, by the Great Southern and Western roads. The railroad brought people within a few minutes from the park. It was very nicely timbered and was in fact almost a natural park. The land contained a little over one hundred acres. It was already laid out in allotments and he (Henry Parkes) contended that it would be a great mistake if the Government allowed it to be sold, as they would not likely get another piece of land suitable for a park

— Sydney Morning Herald, Proposed Public Park at Ashfield, p6, 13 August 1878

Ashfield Park on Parramatta Road is one of the largest public parklands in inner west Sydney. It features large phoenix palms, a war memorial, a children's playground with a statue of Mary Poppins (in recognition of the author PL Travers who lived nearby between 1918–1924), a monument to International Mother Language Day built by former artist-in-residence Ian Marr and the Bangladeshi community, a statue of Philippines national hero Jose Rizal, a sporting field and one of Sydney's oldest bowling clubs. The park, which is just over 6 hectares in area, was proclaimed in 1885 when it was claimed at the time you could 'see all the way to Martin Place'.

The area's major sporting ground is Pratten Park, home of the Western Suburbs grade cricket club in summer and used by the Canterbury District Soccer Football Association in winter. There are also tennis courts and a bowling club adjacent to the main oval. Thirning Villa, located within the park, is home to the Ashfield District Historical Society and an artist in residence sponsored by the local council.

The other sporting field in the area is at Hammond Park on Frederick Street. It predates both Ashfield Park and Pratten Park having begun life in 1877 as a private cricket ground. In 1888, it was intended to be the setting for the first descent of a parachute from a hot air balloon in Australia. However, the parachutist (JT Williams) missed the mark and landed in Homebush, roughly 4 km away. This park was also the site of an ice skating rink in the late 1800s.

The other parks of note in the area are Yeo Park on the southern edge of the suburb and featuring a National Heritage listed band rotunda, and Explorers Park on the corner of Parramatta Road and Liverpool Road, built to commemorate the point where many early British explorers began their journeys west and south. It also features engraved images from early indigenous people in Sydney.

=== Swimming pools ===
The Ashfield Olympic Swimming Centre was first opened on 26 January 1963 by NSW Premier Bob Heffron on Elizabeth Street, Ashfield. It had an outdoor 50 metre pool, a diving pool and tower (also used for water polo), children's pools and later a heated indoor 25 metre pool. The site is highly visible from trains passing on the western line immediately to the south. Due to ongoing dilapidation all pools and buildings were demolished in 2018 when the Inner West Council undertook a $44.7 million redevelopment of the site, reopening on 17 October 2020 as the Ashfield Aquatic Centre with five new pools. The outdoor 50 m pool is open all year round and heated in winter. The facility also includes a multipurpose outdoor pool with an adjustable/moveable floor (which can change its depth by 2.1 m), an outdoor children's pool, an indoor 25-metre multipurpose pool, an indoor baby/toddlers pool, health and fitness centre, sauna, steam and spa, crèche, café and retail space.

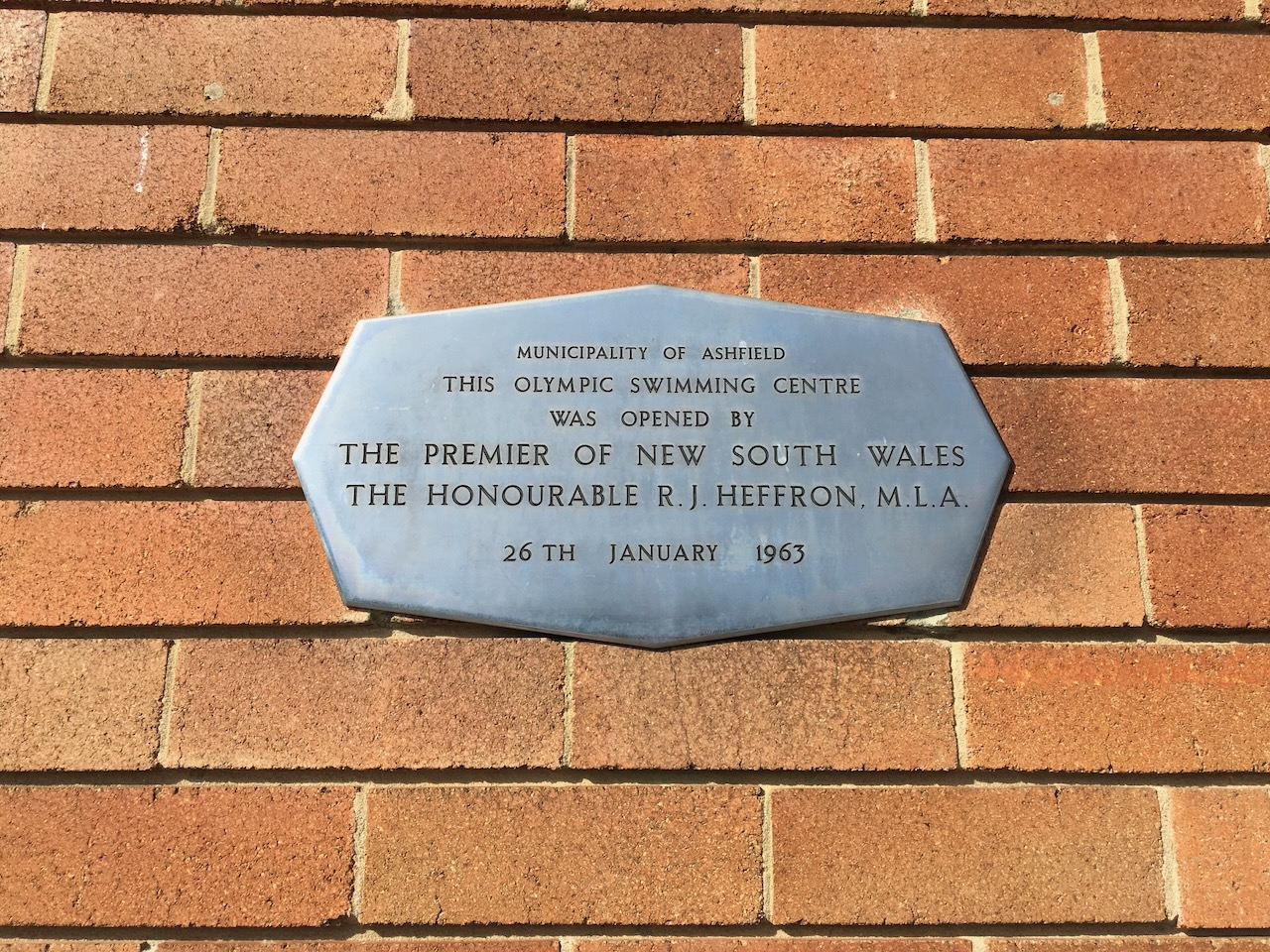
Ashfield Olympic Swimming Centre Plaque, 1963

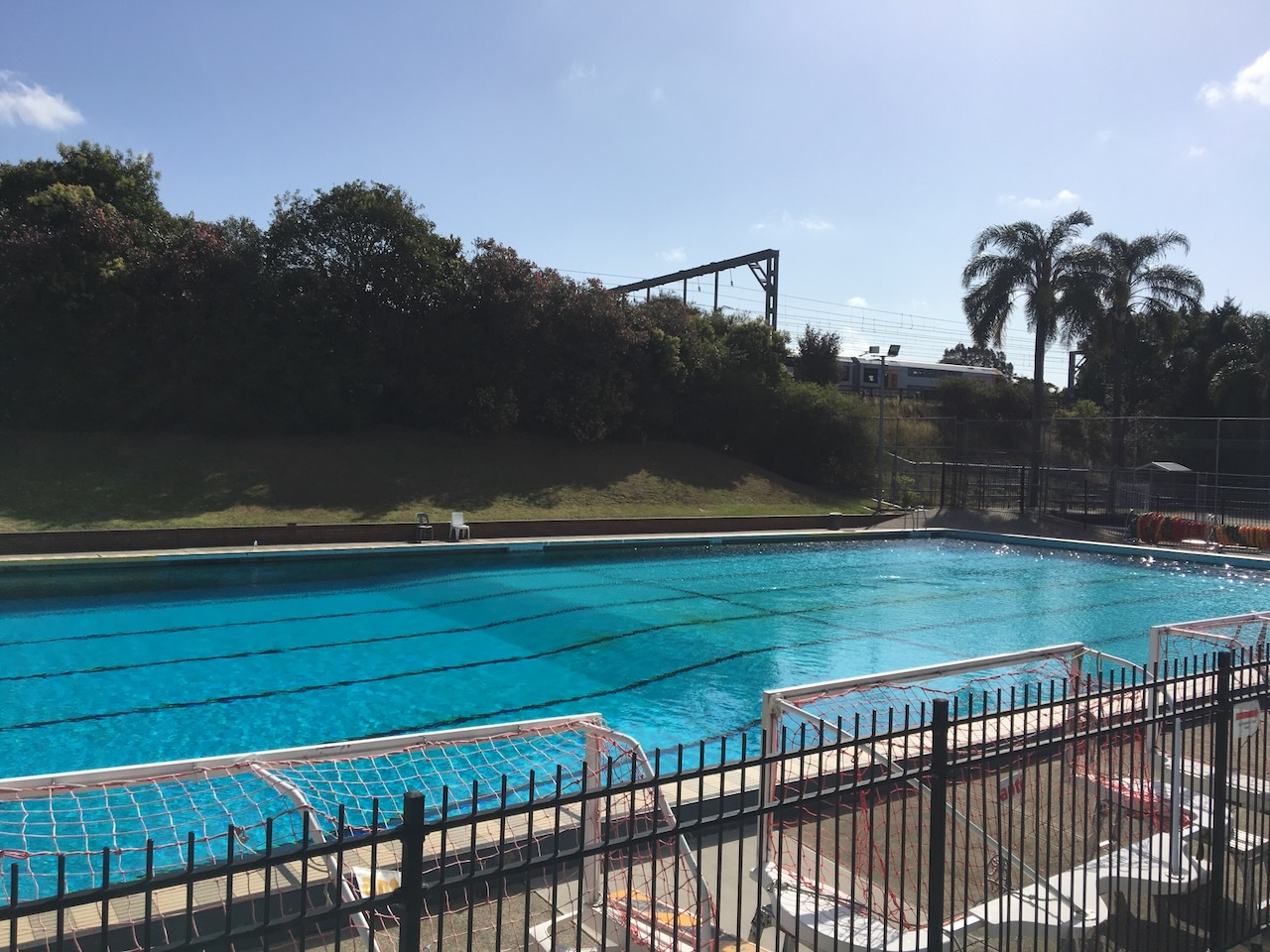
A view of the former diving pool and water polo pool at Ashfield Olympic Swimming Centre, with the rail corridor embankment beyond. Photograph December, 2016.

== Governance ==
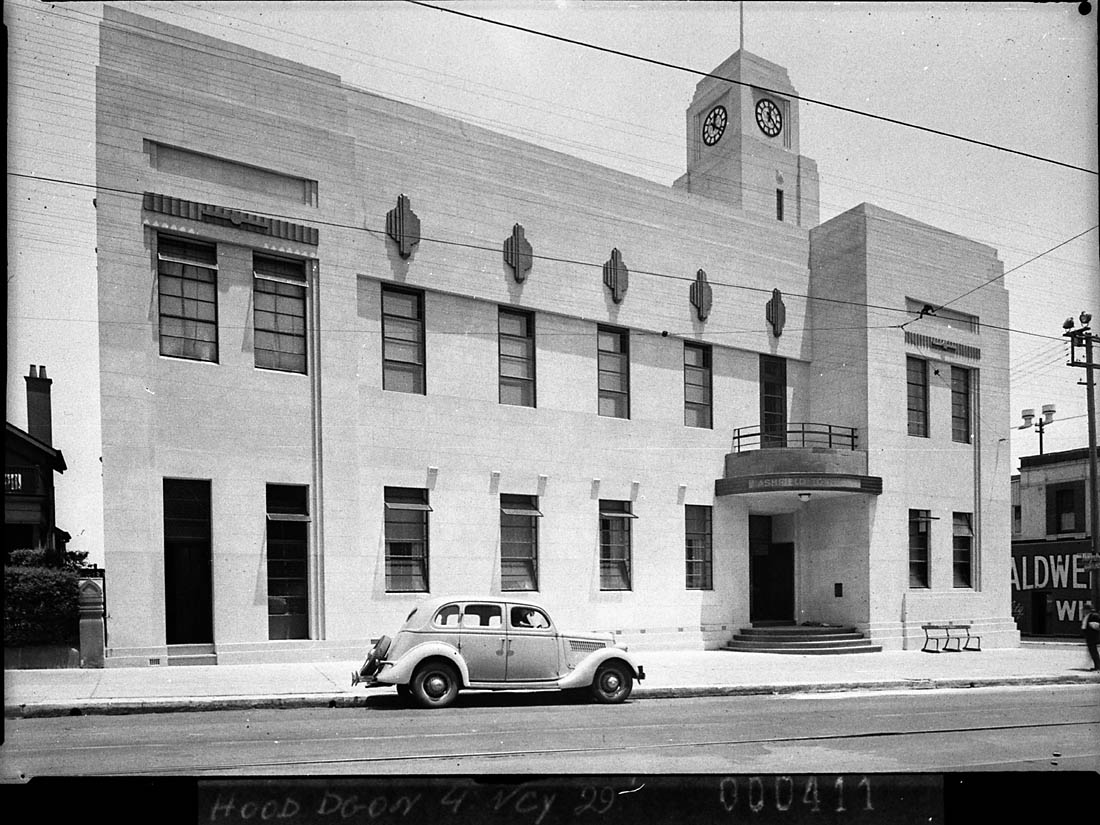
Ashfield Town Hall in 1938. The original Victorian building was extensively remodelled in the Art Deco style in the 1920s. This building was demolished in the 1970s to make way for Ashfield Mall and the current Council buildings. Photo courtesy State Library of NSW

The suburb of Ashfield is within the Inner West Council local government area, in the Inner West region of Sydney in the state of New South Wales, Australia.

For federal elections, Ashfield is part of the electoral division of Grayndler, currently held by Labor's Anthony Albanese. Since 1977, it has mostly been in this division although parts have been in the neighbouring Divisions of Lowe and Watson at various times. Previously, the suburb was in the electorate of Parkes from Federation in 1901 until 1949. From then until 1977, it was in the now abolished electorate of Evans.

For state elections, Ashfield is part of the Summer Hill electorate. Before the 2015 state election, the suburb was split between the electoral divisions of Strathfield and Canterbury. Prior to 1894, Ashfield was in the state electorate of Canterbury. From 1894 until 1999, there was a state electorate of Ashfield, which was abolished when the state government decided to reduce the total number of electorates in the state.

=== Politics ===
Voting in Ashfield
Political party	2008 local government election	Fed10	NSW11	2012 local government election	2017 local government election	2021 local government election
First Preference Results						
Labor	27.36%	48%	41%	26.75%	34.58%	38.92%
Liberal	19.11%	30%	36%	26.96%	20.28%	nc
Greens	22.70%	18%	20%	14.41%	32.72%	36.26%
Independents	28.47%	nc	2%	25.10%	10.32%	14.30%
Other	2.35%	4%	2%	6.78%	2.11%	10.53%
nc=no candidate						

== Demographics ==
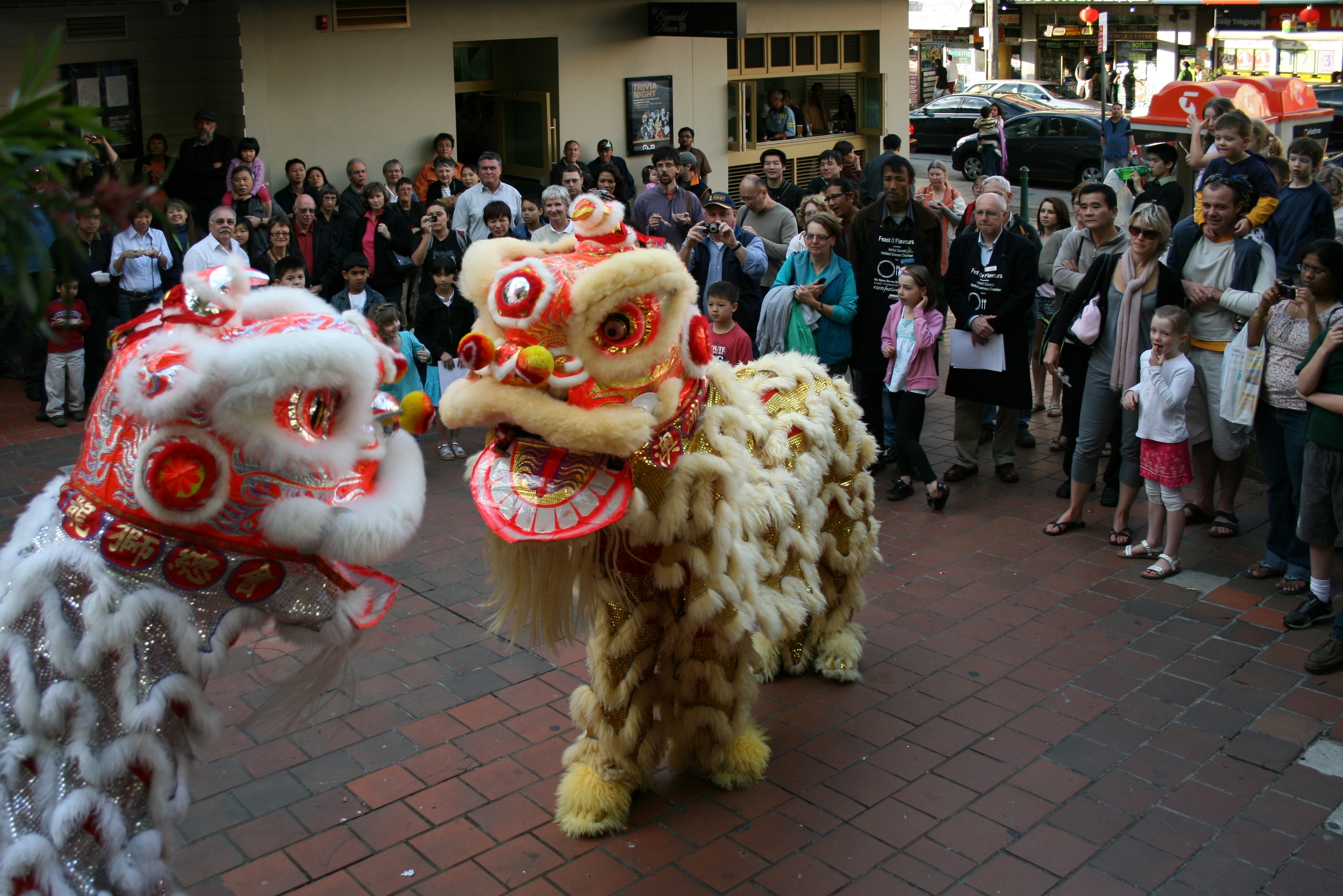
Chinese lion dancing entertains a crowd in the Ashfield shopping mall.

2021 Census Ashfield
	Ashfield	Sydney	Australia
Population	23,012	5,231,147	25,422,788
Median age	36	37	38
Median weekly income	$1,888	$2,077	$1,746
Born in Australia	45%	57%	67%
Born in China	12.2%	4.6%	2.2%
Living in free standing houses	22%	56%	72%
Living in apartments	70%	31%	14%

In the 2021 census of Population and Housing, Ashfield had a population of 23,012 people, in an area of 3.5 square kilometres. The median age (36) was slightly younger than the national average (38) while the median household income ($1,888 per week) was better off than the national average but lower than the figure for the Greater Sydney region.

One area where Ashfield differed markedly from the national figures was in its ethnic mix. The most common reported ancestries in Ashfield at the 2021 census were Chinese 22.1%, English 18.6%, Australian 14.9%, Irish 8.4% and Nepalese 6.9%. Australian born residents are also a plurality with 45.4% of Ashfield residents being Australian-born. The most other common countries of birth were China 12.2%, Nepal 6.7%, India 3.2%, Philippines 2.9% and England 2.1%. 46.0% of people only spoke English at home. Other languages spoken at home included Mandarin 12.5%, Nepali 6.8%, Cantonese 5.3%, Italian 2.2% and Spanish 1.7%.

The most common responses for religion were No Religion 39.6%, Catholic 20.6%, Hinduism 9.5% and Buddhism 6.5%.

The other area where Ashfield differs is its housing. Of the 9,266 occupied private dwellings counted, 69.9% were flats (compared to the national figure of 14.2%), 22.1% were detached houses, while 7.4% were semi-detached or attached houses. Ashfield also had a higher than average number of people renting (50.5%) compared to houses owned outright (22.3%) or being purchased (22.8%).

== Notable residents ==
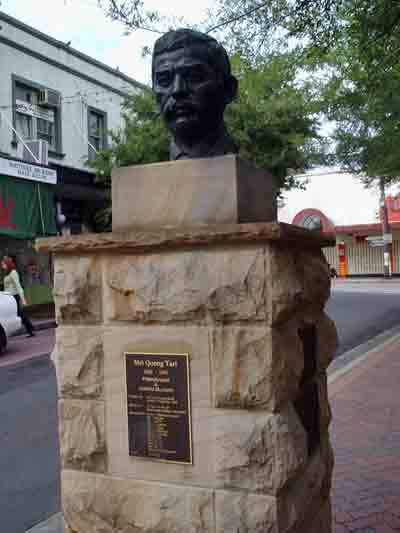
Bust of Mei Quong Tart near Ashfield train station

The following notable people were born or lived in Ashfield:

- Daphne Akhurst (1903–1933): Five times Australian Open tennis champion, who was born in Ashfield.
- Marjorie Barnard (1897–1987): writer
- Robert Campbell (1769–1846): Early settler responsible for giving Ashfield its name.
- Ian Clunies Ross (1899–1959): Veterinary scientist and founder of the CSIRO, he was for a while commemorated on the Australian $50 note.
- Rev Bill Crews (1946–): As the Minister of Ashfield Uniting Church, he created the Exodus Foundation to assist homeless and abandoned youth.
- Sir Henry Parkes (1815–1896): 7th Premier of New South Wales and "Father of Federation", he lived in Ashfield during the 1870s.
- Mei Quong Tart (1850–1903): businessman, tea house owner and acting consul to the Imperial Chinese government in the late 19th century.
- P. L. Travers (1899–1996): Author of five volumes of Mary Poppins stories, she lived in Ashfield at 40 Pembroke Street between 1918 and 1924 during her later school years attending the Normanhurst School on Orpington Street.

== Culture ==
=== Events ===
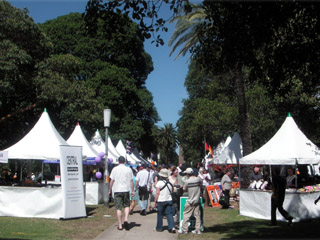
2007 Carnival of Cultures

The major community event in Ashfield each year is the Carnival of Cultures, a celebration of the area's multiculturalism. Held every year since 1996 in Ashfield Park, it includes performances, food stalls and children's entertainment. In recent years, the Sydney Writers' Festival has also held part of its library program in Ashfield as part of the regular Authors at Ashfield (since the 2016 merger to the Inner West Council, it has been known as 'speaker series') series of talks.

=== Arts ===
Ashfield Council developed a program of community arts in the suburb, which has continued into the merge into Inner West Council in 2016. This included the funding of an artist-in-residence program, who is based at Thirning Villa in Pratten Park. The current artist is the Refugee Art Project and New Moon Collective. Part of their residency involves artist talks, community workshops and teaching/educating at local schools. In front of Thirning Villa is Ashfield's version of the Rosetta Stone, made by former artist-in-residence Ian Marr and featuring a passage from the Iliad by Homer in twelve different community languages. Another former artist was the writer Van Badham.

=== Sport ===
Ashfield has a long history with the sport of rugby league. The Western Suburbs Magpies rugby league team was formed in Ashfield in 1908 and played in the inaugural New South Wales Rugby League competition that year. The club won its four premierships (1930, 1934, 1948 & 1952) while based at Pratten Park. It moved west to Lidcombe Oval in 1967, then southwest to Campbelltown Stadium in 1987. In 2000, the club merged with the Balmain Tigers to form the Wests Tigers which splits its games between Leichhardt Oval and Campbelltown. The Wests Leagues Club has stayed in Ashfield since 1908 despite the wanderings of its home ground.

Ashfield also holds a cycling milestone when it hosted the first woman's cycling race in the world in 1888. Dorothy Morrell won the two-mile (3 km) race.

Hammond Park is the site of the first cricket pitch in Ashfield. It was established in 1875 and originally owned and leased by a local butcher. It was later sold to the Ashfield Cricket Club and then, in 1910, to Ashfield Council who renamed it "Hammond Park" after former mayor Mark J. Hammond.
