= Car dealership =

Business that sells and trades new or used vehicles

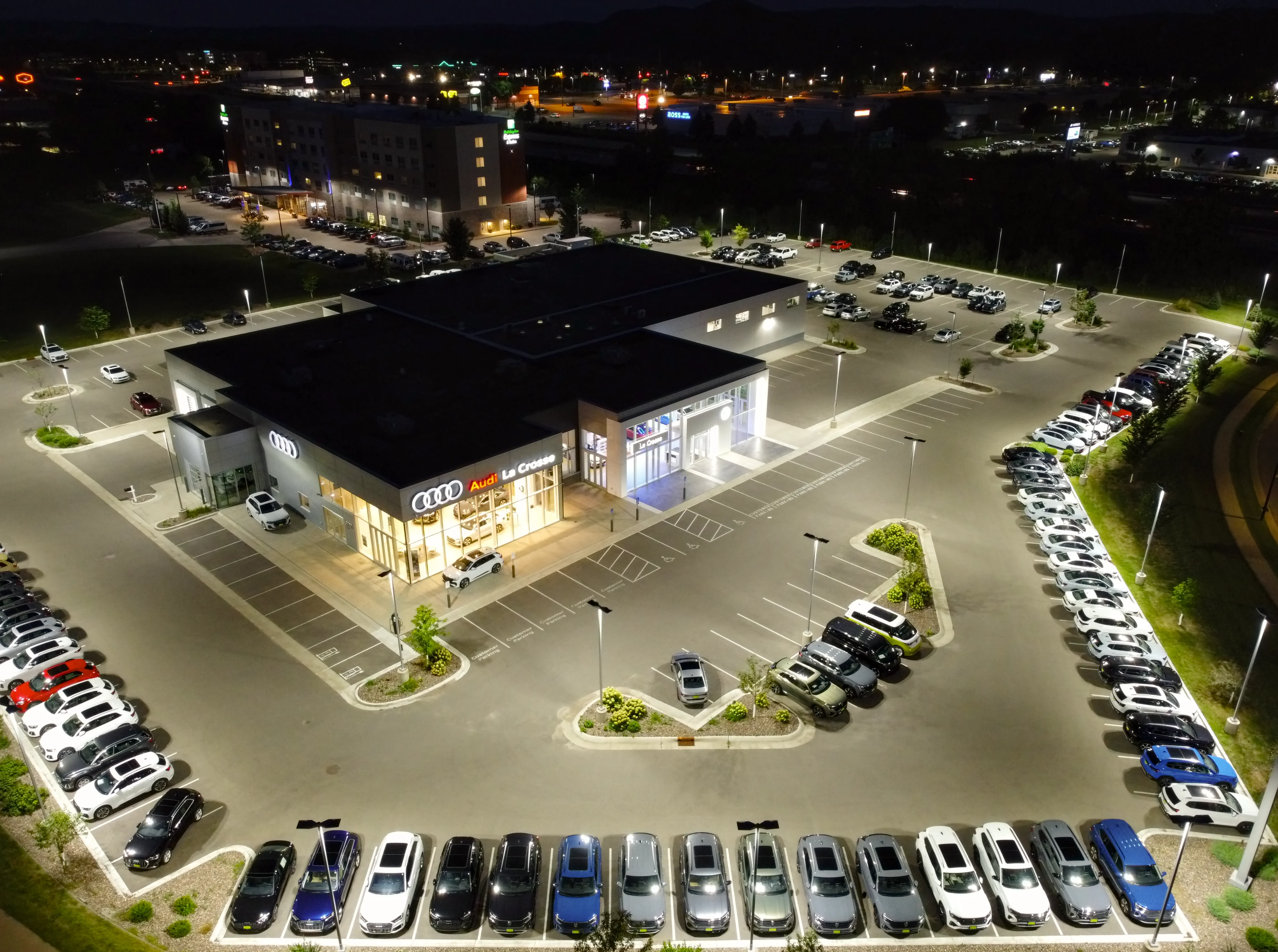
Exterior of an Audi dealership in Onalaska, Wisconsin at night, as pictured above

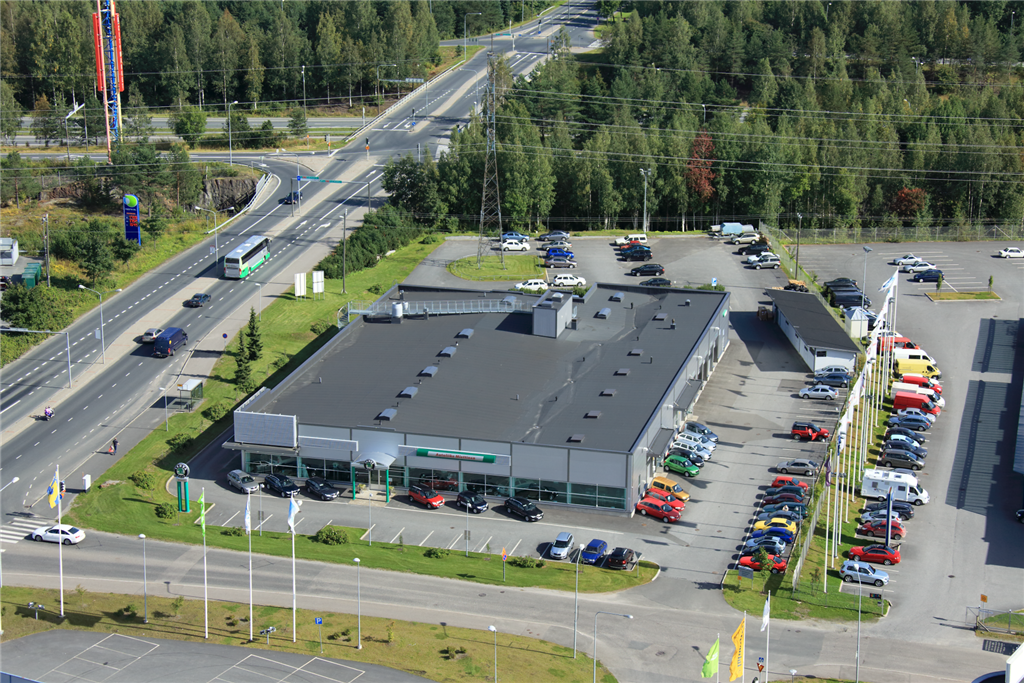
An aerial view of a Škoda auto dealer's service in Kuopio, Finland

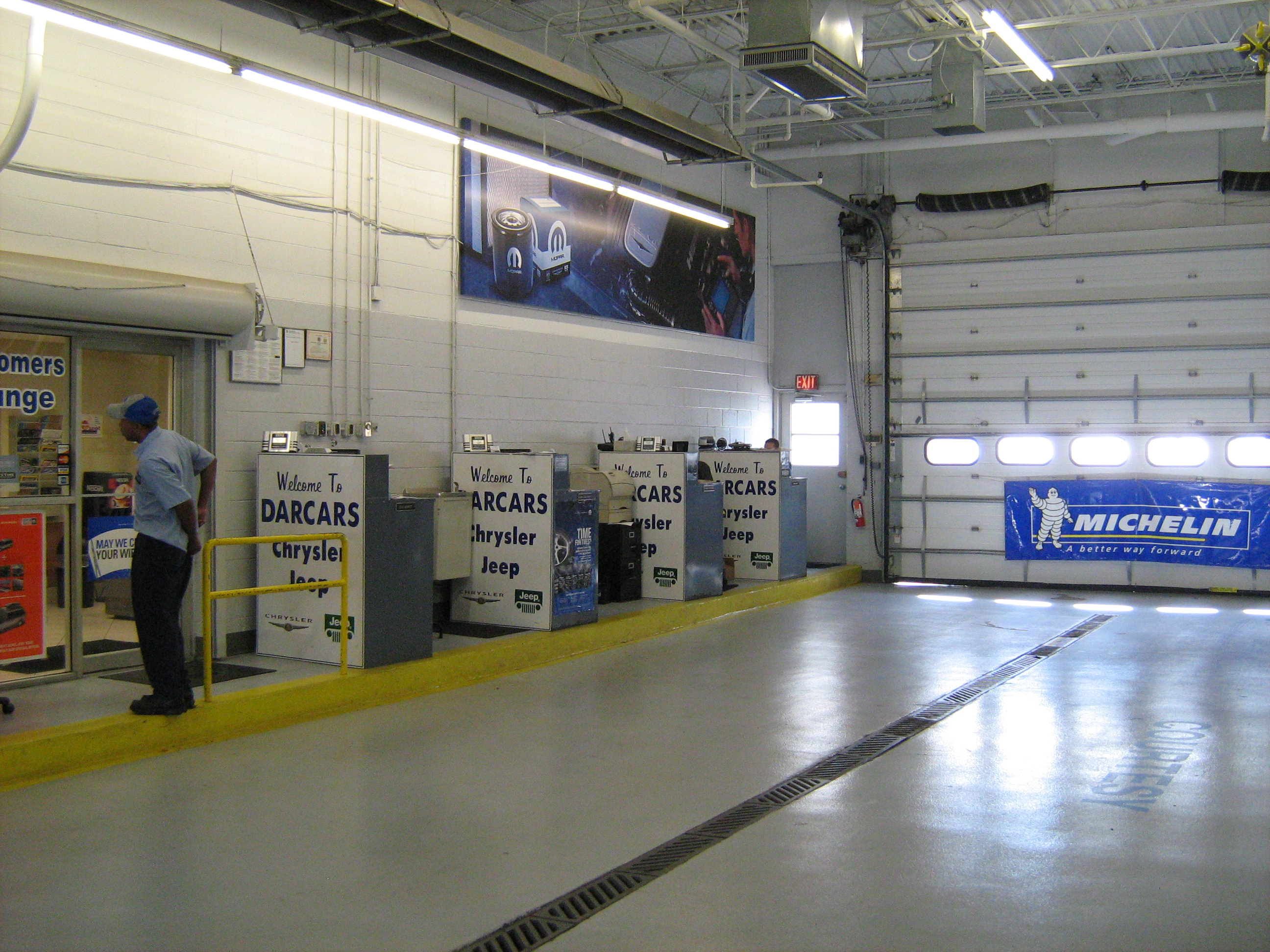
Service and repair entrance

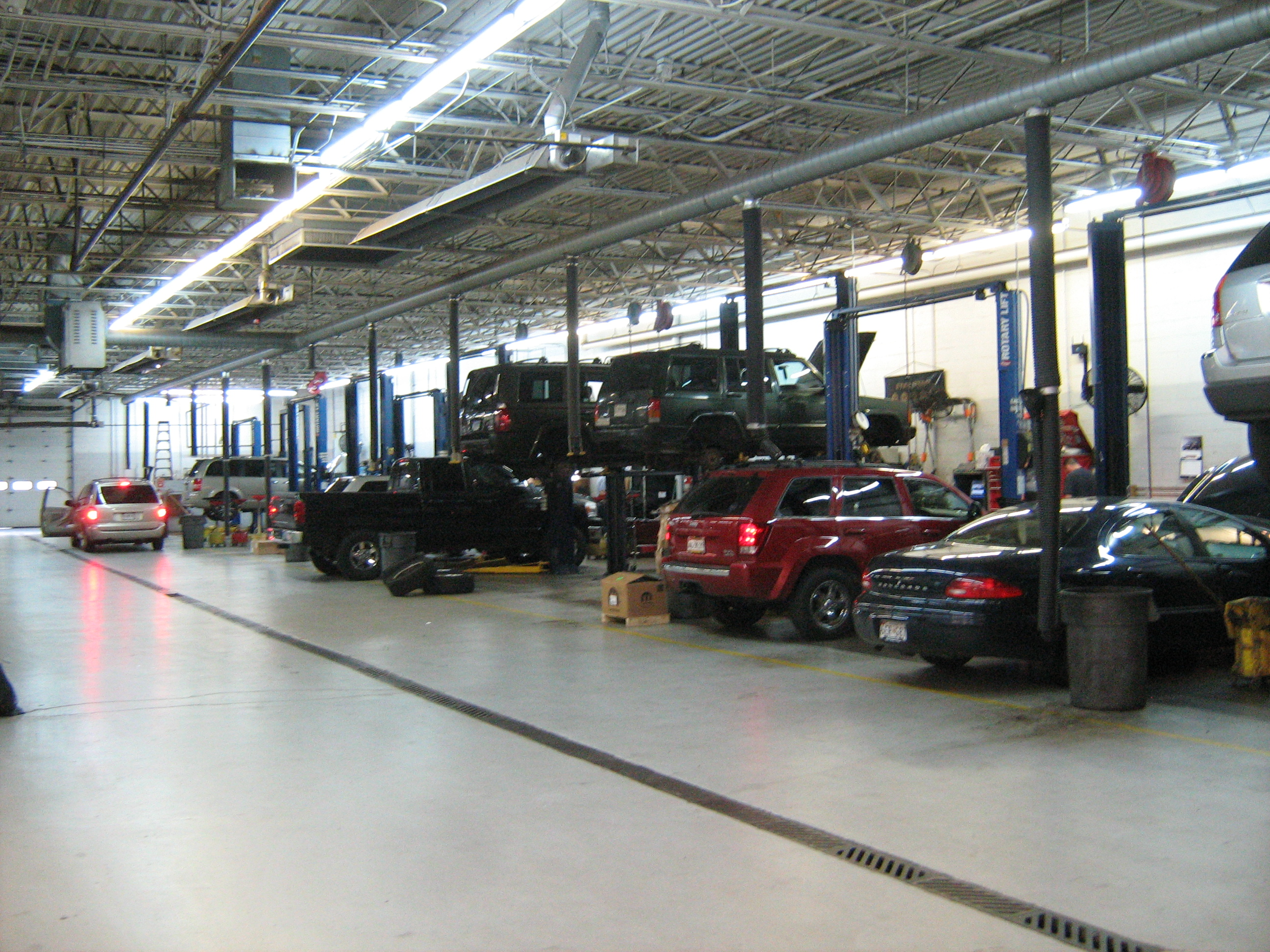
Auto dealer's service and repair facility

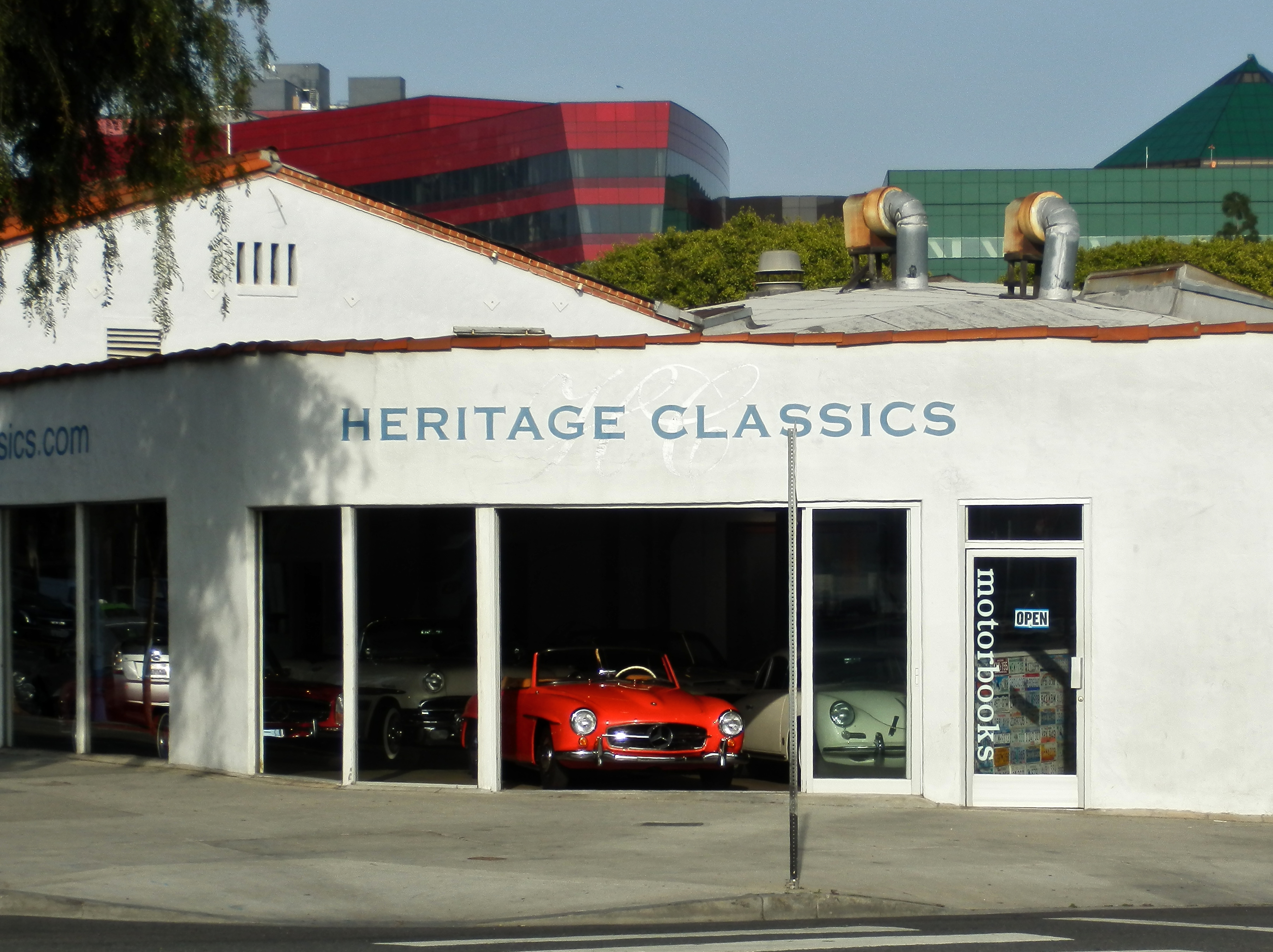
Dealer for vintage cars

A car dealership, or car dealer, is a business that sells new or used cars, at the retail level, based on a dealership contract with an automaker or its sales subsidiary. Car dealerships also often sell spare parts and automotive maintenance services.

In the United States, car dealerships have historically been an important source of state and local sales taxes. They have considerable political influence and have lobbied for regulations that guarantee their survival and profitability. By 2010, all 50 states and DC had laws that prohibit manufacturers from side-stepping independent car dealerships and selling cars directly to consumers. By 2009, most states imposed restrictions on the creation of new dealerships to compete with incumbent dealerships.

Economists have characterized these regulations as a form of rent-seeking that extracts rents from manufacturers of cars, increases costs for consumers, and limits entry of new car dealerships while raising profits for incumbent car dealers. Research shows that as a result of these laws, retail prices for cars are higher than they otherwise would be.

== Car dealerships in the United States ==
The early cars were sold by automakers to customers directly or through a variety of channels, including mail order, department stores, and traveling representatives. For example, Sears made its first attempt at selling a gasoline-engined chain-drive high-wheeler in 1908 through its mail-order catalog and starting in 1951 the Allstate through select its stores and the catalog.

The first car dealership was opened in 1889 by Fred Koller in Reading, Pennsylvania and sold cars manufactured in Cleveland, Ohio. This would have been the first dealership solely dedicated to automobiles, as opposed to horse-drawn carriages.

The first Ford dealer was opened by William L. Hughson in San Francisco in January 1903. The first woman car dealer in the United States was Rachel "Mommy" Krouse who in 1903 opened her business, Krouse Motor Car Company, in Philadelphia, Pennsylvania.

Today, direct sales by an automaker to consumers are limited by most states in the U.S. through franchise laws that require new cars to be sold only by licensed and bonded, independently owned dealerships.

The number of car dealerships in the US peaked in 1927 at 53,125 and steadily decreased over the next decades. By 1960, there were 33,658 dealerships; by 1980, 23,379; and by 2001, 22,007.

Car dealerships are usually franchised to sell and service vehicles by specific companies. They are often located on properties offering enough room to have buildings housing a showroom, mechanical service, and body repair facilities, as well as to provide storage for used and new vehicles. Many dealerships are located out of town or on the edge of town centers. An example of a traditional single proprietorship car dealership was Collier Motors in North Carolina. Many modern dealerships are now part of corporate-owned chains with hundreds of locations. Dealership profits in the US mainly come from servicing, some from used cars, and little from new cars.

Most automotive manufacturers have shifted the focus of their franchised retailers to branding and technology. New or refurbished facilities are required to have a standard look for their dealerships and have product experts to liaise with customers. Audi has experimented with a hi-tech showroom that allows customers to configure and experience cars on 1:1 scale digital screens. In markets where it is permitted, Mercedes-Benz opened city centre brand stores.

Tesla, Inc. rejected the dealership sales model, claiming that dealerships do not properly explain the advantages of their cars over vehicles with an internal combustion engine, and thus they could not rely on third-party dealerships to handle their sales. However, in the United States, direct manufacturer auto sales are prohibited in many states by franchise laws that requires new cars to be sold only by franchised dealers. In response, Tesla operates city centre galleries where prospective customers can view their cars which can only be ordered online. These stores were inspired by the Apple Stores. Tesla's model was the first of its kind, and has given them unique advantages as a new car company.

=== Economic theory ===
In economic theory, car dealerships can be characterized as franchisees and automobile manufacturers as franchisors. A franchise relationship can be beneficial to both parties, as the franchisee can sell a well-made and attractive product while the franchisor can rely on the franchisee to incur downstream costs and use its local relationships to sell more products and services.

The franchisor can act opportunistically by imposing constraints and burden on the franchisee after the latter has incurred sunk costs, such as investing in physical assets and building up a reputation with customers. The franchisor could for example require that cars be sold at low prices, and services be performed for little compensation. The franchisee could on the other hand act opportunistically by using its local monopoly to perform poor customer service, charge customers more, and pass those unnecessarily high costs to the franchisor.

=== Regulations that protect car dealers ===
Car dealerships have lobbied for regulations that increase the survival and profitability of car dealerships:

- By 2010, all US states had laws that prohibited manufacturers from side-stepping independent car dealers and selling cars to customers directly.
- By 2009, most states imposed restrictions on the creation of new dealerships to compete with incumbent dealerships.
- All states impose severe limits on the ability of a manufacturer to terminate a franchise relationship.
- Most states prevent manufacturers from engaging in "quantity forcing" whereby manufacturers require that dealers purchase vehicles that they had not ordered.
- Most states limit the ability of manufacturers to discriminate between car dealers (for example, by providing better terms to large car dealers with economies of scale or dealers that provide better customer service).
- Many state laws impose upon manufacturers the precise terms under which they must compensate dealers for the costs associated with warranty repairs (these can incentivize dealers to increase the price of repairs to customers).
- Most state laws require upon the termination of a dealership that manufacturers buy back the inventory, and special equipment and in some cases pay the rent of the dealer's facilities.

The issuance of new dealership licenses can be subject to geographical restriction; if there is already a dealership for a company in an area, no one else can open one. This has led to dealerships becoming in essence hereditary, with families running dealerships in an area since the original issuance of their license with no fear of competition or any need to prove qualification or consumer benefit (beyond proving they meet minimum legal standards), as franchises in most jurisdictions can only be withdrawn for illegal activity and no other reason.

==== Criticism ====
Economists have characterized these laws as a form of rent-seeking that extracts rents from manufacturers of cars and increases costs for consumers of cars while raising profits for car dealers. Multiple studies have shown that regulations that protect car dealerships increase car costs for consumers and limit the profitability of manufacturers.

This has led to consumer campaigns for establishment or reform, which have been met by huge lobbying efforts by franchise holders. New companies trying to enter the market, such as Tesla, have been restricted by this model and have either been forced out or been forced to work around the franchise model, facing constant legal pressure.

=== Electric vehicles ===
According to a 2023 survey by the Sierra Club, two-thirds of US car dealerships did not have electric or hybrid vehicles for sale. Reasons for this include supply chain difficulties, as well as a need for car dealers to make substantial investments in new employee training and infrastructure to be able to sell, service and maintain electric vehicles.

== Car dealerships in the European Union ==
In the European Union, car manufacturers were permitted from 1985 to 2006 to enter into contracts with car dealerships that restricted what kinds of cars dealers were permitted to sell. Car manufacturers were able "to impose qualitative, quantitative and geographical restrictions on supply by selling their cars only through a limited number of dealers bound by strict franchise agreements." In 2006, the European Commission determined that it was anti-competitive for car manufacturers to prohibit dealers from carrying multiple car brands.

Car manufacturers in the European Union are increasingly shifting towards selling cars directly to customers without reliance on independent dealers. Volvo has announced plans to sell all vehicles directly to customers by 2030.

== Multibrand car dealers ==
Multibrand and multi-maker car dealers sell cars from different and independent carmakers. Some are specialized in electric vehicles.

== Auto transport ==
Auto transport is used to move vehicles from the factory to the dealerships. This includes international and domestic shipping. It was largely a commercial activity conducted by manufacturers, dealers, and brokers. Internet use has encouraged this niche service to expand and reach the general consumer marketplace.

== See also ==
- Auto auction
- Auto row
- Automaker
- Car broker
- Car rental
- List of auto dealership and repair shop buildings
- Showroom
- Used car

=== Organizations ===
- Carfax
- Kelley Blue Book
- Federation of Automobile Dealers Associations of India (FADA)
- National Automobile Dealers Association
- Presidential Task Force on the Auto Industry
