= Anil Lamba =

Indian author (born 1959)

- Born: December 15, 1959 (age 66); New Delhi, India
- Education: CA; PhD in Taxation
- Occupations: Chartered accountant, author
- Website: anillamba.com

Anil Lamba (born 15 December 1959) is an Indian, author, chartered accountant, financial literacy activist, corporate trainer, and TEDx speaker. He promotes “Financial Literacy for All,” a novel initiative to develop a financially intelligent India.

== Work ==
He is a practicing-chartered accountant and a corporate trainer. As a speaker, he spoke at India Business Literature Festival – IBLF Pune (2023), Federation of Automobile Dealers Associations (FADA) conferences, which is apex national body of Automobile Retail Industry in India, Radiant Wellness Conclave, Federation of Indian Chambers of Commerce and Industry (FICCI), which is the apex body of industry and commerce in India. Orange City Literature Festival (OCLF). He has spoken at several TEDx conferences too and regularly addresses chapters of the Entrepreneurs Organization (EO), Young Presidents Organization (YPO), Confederation of Indian Industry (CII) and others.

== Literary works ==
He has written several books. His writings focus on guiding entrepreneurs in making informed financial decisions necessary to gain sustainable profitability in businesses.

- Lamba, Anil (31 December 2019). Romancing the Balance Sheet (1st ed.). HarperCollins. ISBN 9789353020378.
- Lamba, Anil (25 June 2019). Eye On The Bottom Line (1st ed.). HarperCollins. ISBN 9789353029500.
- Lamba, Anil (2018). Flirting with Stocks: Stock Market Investing for Beginners (1st ed.). Westland Books. ISBN 9789387578661.
- Lamba, Anil (25 August 2024). Timeless Wisdom On Finance (1st ed.). HarperCollins. ISBN 9789362136541.
- Lamba, Anil (19 August 2019). Financial Affairs Of The Common Man: Master the Art of Personal Finance Management (1st ed.). Penguin Books. ISBN 9789353055998.
