= Graeme Innes =

Australian human rights advocate

Graeme Innes AM
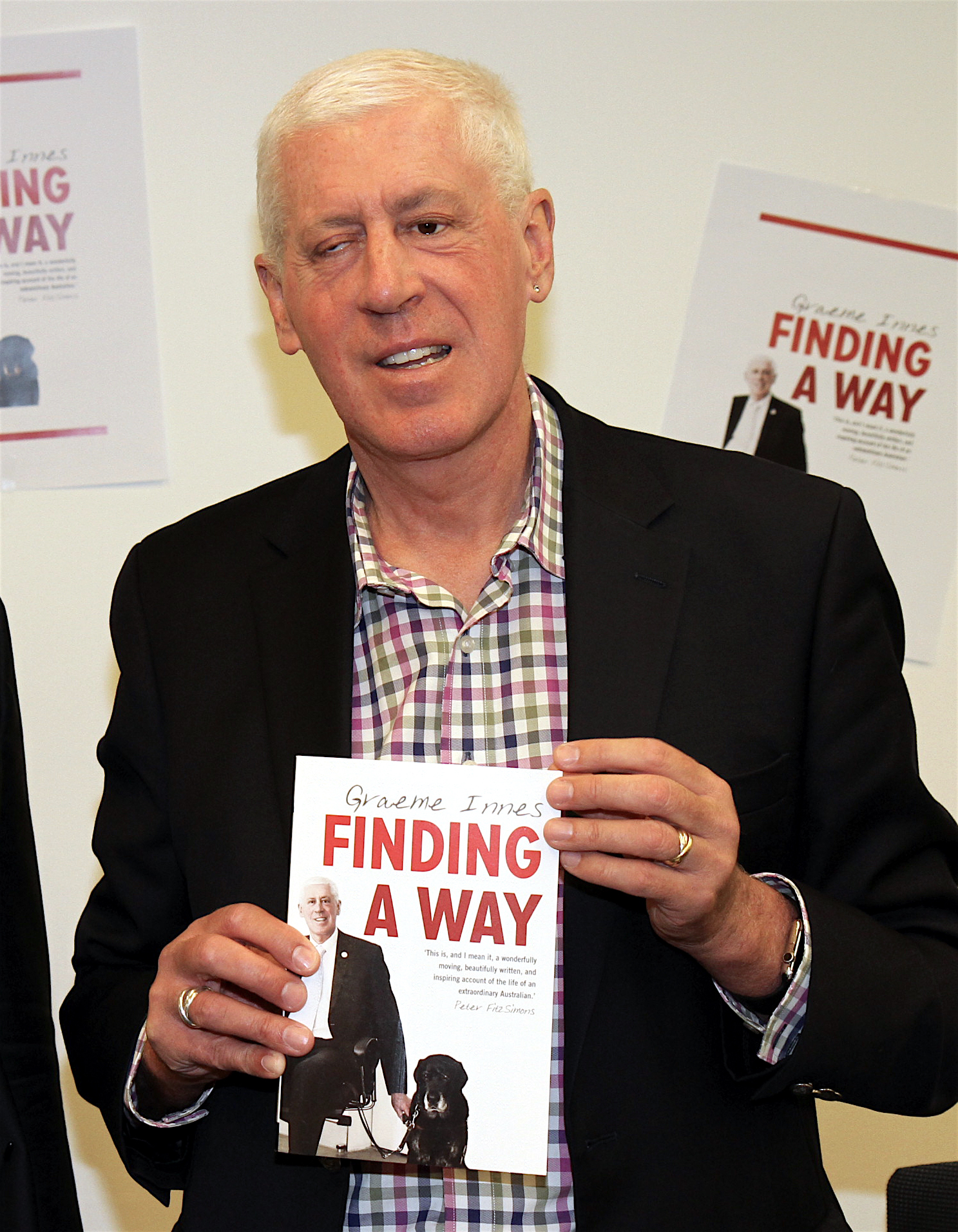
- Innes at the launch of his book Finding A Way in 2016
- Born: 9 August 1955 (age 71); Sydney, New South Wales, Australia
- Education: University of Sydney
- Occupation: lawyer
- Known for: Being Australia's Disability Discrimination Commissioner from 2005 to 2014

Graeme Gordon Innes AM (born 9 August 1955) is an Australian lawyer, mediator and company director, university chancellor and was Australia's Disability Discrimination Commissioner from December 2005 to July 2014.

As a human rights advocate for the past 30 years he has played a role in many human rights and disability initiatives, including the drafting of the United Nations Convention on the Rights of Persons with Disabilities.

In 2013, Innes won a case against RailCorp, which was found to have discriminated against blind and visually impaired passengers.

Innes was admitted as a Member of the Order of Australia in 1995 in recognition of his human rights work and his contribution to the rights of people with disability in Australia.

== Early life and education ==
Innes was born in Sydney, Australia. The son of Alwyn and Dorothy Innes, he has an older sister and younger brother. Alwyn Innes had been a councillor on Ashfield Municipal Council. Due to congenital issues, Innes was born totally blind. His parents were shocked by the news of his disability but endeavoured to treat him in the same way as his siblings. Innes believes this approach benefitted him in life.

At age four, Innes and his family moved to a residence in the grounds of the Masonic Hospital (now the Sydney Private Hospital) in Ashfield, when Innes' father Alwyn was appointed its CEO. Innes grew up there.

Innes attended the North Rocks School for Blind Children, run by the New South Wales Department of Education on a site owned by the Royal Institute for Deaf and Blind Children. He was made school captain in 1971 in early recognition of his leadership capacities. He was thereafter one of the first blind children integrated into the mainstream school system, attending Ashfield Boys High School for Years 11 and 12 in 1972–73. He was a prefect at this school, and a member of the 1972 debating team that won many competitions. He then undertook law studies at the University of Sydney, where he graduated with a Bachelor of Laws degree in 1978, and gained the foundation for his later specialisation in social justice and human rights law.

== Career ==
=== Early career ===
After completing practical legal training at the College of Law in 1978, Innes applied for about 30 jobs, but many employers did not understand how a blind person could work as a lawyer. He gained a position as a clerical assistant with the NSW Public Service, and two years later became a legal officer at the Department of Consumer Affairs. He became a conciliator in 1983, first at the NSW Anti-Discrimination Board and then at the WA Equal Opportunity Commission.

Innes worked for Qantas (1993–1995), initially managing the airline’s Disability Services Project, and then as the company's Equal Employment Opportunity Officer. He then moved to Westpac, where he was Manager of Disability Projects (1995–1997).

He was a Hearing Commissioner with the Human Rights and Equal Opportunity Commission (1994–2001). In this role, he heard the cases of Finney v Hills Grammar School, and Purvis v NSW Department of Education, which resulted in the landmark decisions that the schools in question had discriminated against a child on the basis of their disability (either refusing enrolment, or excluding the child) in breach of the Disability Discrimination Act 1992. In 1997, Innes ruled in favour of anti-smoking activist Sue Meeuwissen in her suit against Hilton Hotels, finding that the hotel chain had triggered Meeuwissen's asthma by failing to protect her from secondhand smoke at its venue.

Innes then became the Deputy Disability Discrimination Commissioner at the Australian Human Rights Commission from 1999 to 2005. As a tribunal member, he maintained a high resolution rate of complaints using conciliation for tribunals including the NSW Administrative Decisions Tribunal (1996–2005); the NSW Consumer, Trader and Tenancy Tribunal (1996–2005); and the Social Security Appeals Tribunal.

Throughout his early career, Innes held leadership positions in disability advocacy organisations. He was the first Chair of Disabled Peoples International (Australia) which became People with Disability Australia (1983–1987), and Chair of Royal Blind Society (1995–2004) and was the first Chair of Australia's national blindness agency, Vision Australia (2004–2005). He was the Chair of the Commonwealth Disability Advisory Council of Australia 1989–1993, which achieved passage by government of the Disability Discrimination Act in 1992, and which developed a plan to improve transport accessibility (which later became the Accessible Transport Standards). He was also Deputy Chair of the Australian Disability Consultative Council This council was replaced by the National People with Disabilities and Carer Council, which has is now replaced with Disability and Carers Industry Advisory Council 1995–1996, and Chair of World Blind Union (Asia Pacific Region) 2002–2005. He has been a board member of the NSW Disability Discrimination Legal Centre; Life Without Barriers;, Livable Housing Australia and is a board member of disability employment service, Joblife Employment.

=== Later career ===
Innes was appointed Australia's Disability Discrimination Commissioner in December 2005. During that time, he also served as Australia's Human Rights Commissioner (2005–2009) and as Race Discrimination Commissioner (2009–2011). As Commissioner, Innes contributed to human rights reform initiatives. He participated in the drafting of the United Nations Convention on the Rights of Persons with Disabilities and its ratification by Australia. He also played an instrumental role in the Same Sex: Same Entitlements enquiry, which resulted in the removal of discrimination across Australian federal law.

Innes also contributed to the development of the National Disability Strategy and the Disability (Access to Premises – buildings) Standards 2010, as well as to the establishment of Livable Housing Australia. In his role as Human Rights Commissioner, he undertook three annual inspections of Australia's Immigration Detention facilities.

As a human rights advocate, in his personal capacity as well as professionally, Innes has contributed to a number of reforms for people with disability. In 2013 acting in a personal capacity, he won a case in the Federal Magistrates Court against RailCorp (which delivers train services in NSW). The magistrate found RailCorp had discriminated against blind and visually impaired passengers by refusing to commit to a program of improving station announcements on Sydney trains so that passengers would know where to get off. Innes won the case and $10,000 damages, after RailCorp spent more than $400,000 on its unsuccessful defence. Also in 2013, Innes initiated an online petition calling on department store Myer to increase its employment of people with disability to 10 per cent of its workforce. This action was in response to a negative statement by Myer's CEO about the National Disability Insurance Scheme. Innes' petition gained 35,000 signatures within a few days.

Innes has been an advocate for the implementation of cinema captioning and audio descriptions in Australia.

He has delivered a number of public speeches, and penned opinion pieces in mainstream Australian media. He is also regular user of Twitter.

In December 2022, Innes was appointed chancellor of Central Queensland University. He is the first university chancellor in an Australian university to identify as having a disability.

== Achievements ==
- Passing of the Disability Discrimination Act 1992
- Passing of the UN Convention on Rights of Persons with Disabilities
- Passing of the UN Optional Protocol on Rights of Persons with Disabilities

=== Honours ===
Innes was made a Member of the Order of Australia in 1995 for service to the community, particularly as an adviser on disability anti-discrimination policy. He was also shortlisted for Australian of the Year in 2004.

Academic

- Fellow, Australian Institute of Company Directors
- Adjunct Professor, University of Sydney
- Honorary Doctor of the University, University of Canberra, 2014, in recognition of his work as a human rights activist.
- Honorary Doctor of Social Sciences, RMIT University, 2016, in recognition of his national contribution to public service and advocacy of human rights, particularly for people with disabilities.
- Honorary Doctorate, University of New South Wales, 2017

Other awards

- Outstanding Supporter Award, 2008 – Gay & Lesbian Rights Lobby
- Outstanding Service Award, 1976–2005 – Vision Australia
- David Blyth Award, 1999 – Blind Citizens Australia
- Civic Medallion, 1992 – City of Perth, Western Australia

== Personal life ==
Innes is married to Maureen Shelley. He has an adult son and daughter. He enjoys cricket and sailing.
