= Ashfield Mall =

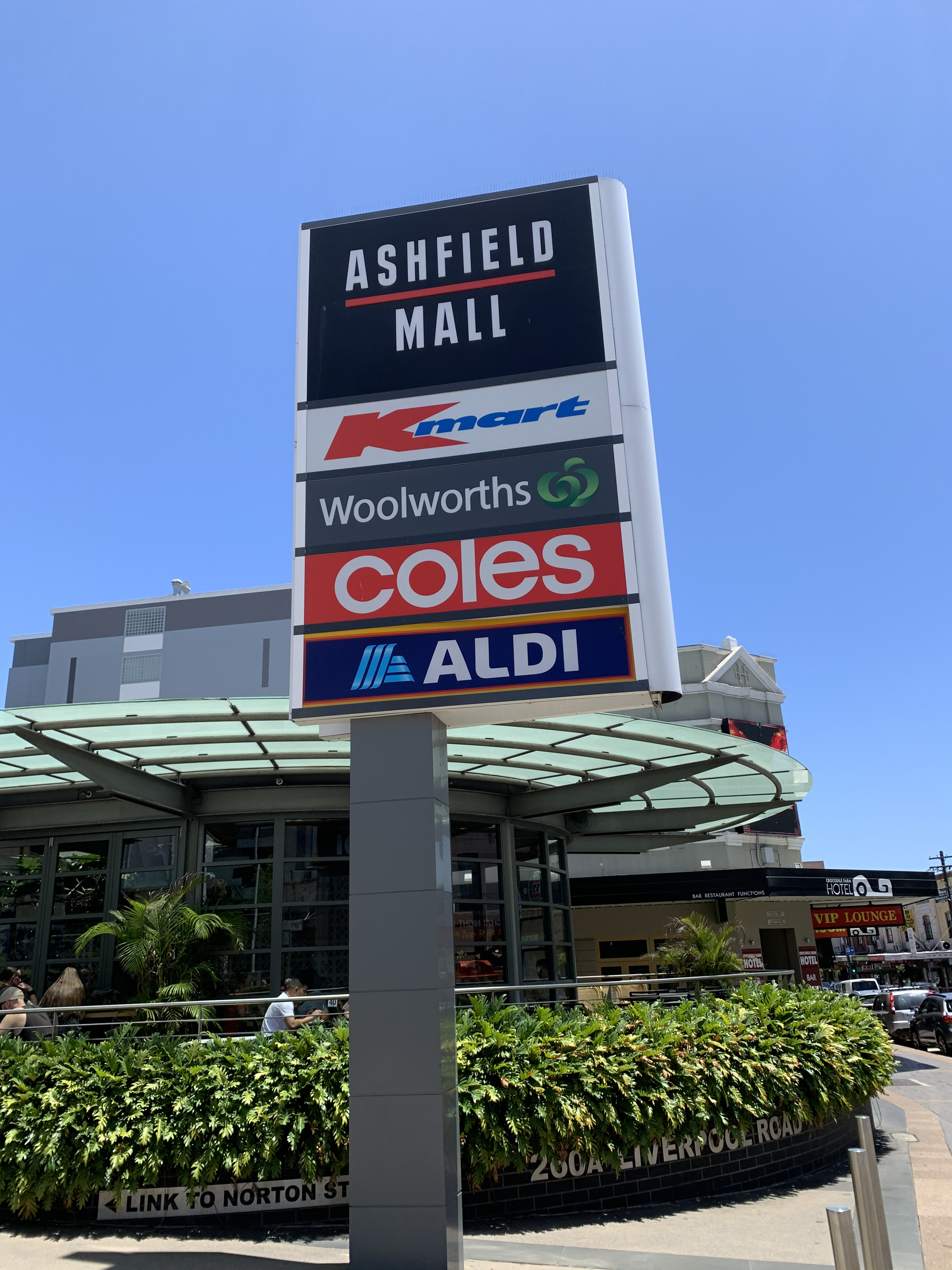
- Ashfield Mall signage in December 2020
- Location: Ashfield, New South Wales
- Coordinates: 33.889576°S 151.124303°E
- Address: 260A Liverpool Rd, Ashfield NSW 2131
- Opened: 1983; 43 years ago
- Manager: Mintus
- Owner: Mintus
- Num. of stores: 80
- Num. of anchor tenants: 4
- Floor area: 24,976 m^{2} (268,839 sq ft)
- Floors: 3
- Parking: 1,087 spaces
- Public transit: Ashfield railway station
- Website: www.ashfieldmall.com.au

Ashfield Mall is a shopping centre in the suburb of Ashfield in the Inner West of Sydney.

== Transport ==
The Inner West & Leppington Line offer frequent services to Ashfield station which is a short walk from the centre.

Ashfield Mall has bus connections to the Sydney CBD, Inner West, Eastern Suburbs, St George and Greater Western Sydney, as well as local surrounding suburbs. The majority of its bus services are located on Liverpool Road.

Ashfield Mall has multi level car park with 1,087 spaces.

== History ==
Ashfield Mall opened in 1983 on the former Ashfield Town Hall (which was demolished in the 1980s). It included four anchor tenants - Coles New World, Franklins, Target and Kmart.

Ashfield Mall was acquired by Abacus Property Group in September 1997. Target closed its store in 2006 due to poor sales and Ashfield Mall underwent redevelopment which included the addition of a Woolworths supermarket & addition of specialty shops on the former Target store.

In 2013, Ashfield Mall underwent a redevelopment which included a new food court with a contemporary décor that included a sushi bar, enclosed eating area, brighter lighting and an Aldi store which opened on the space vacated by Franklins. This redevelopment was completed in August 2013.

Ashfield Mall underwent a redevelopment which featured the building of 101 apartments and refurbishment of the main entry into the shopping centre. Stage 2 redevelopment encompassed the additional building of 6,500m² of retail space and a childcare centre which opened in 2017, and the 67 serviced apartments known as "Ashfield Central", which opened in early 2018.

In July 2018 ISPT acquired a 50% stake of Ashfield Mall for $102.3 million from Abacus Property.

== Tenants ==
Ashfield Mall has 24,976m² of floor space. The major retailers include Kmart, Aldi, Coles and Woolworths.

== Incident ==
On 13 April 2018, a gas explosion caused the evacuation of the centre at around 5 p.m. A man suffered burns to 50 percent of his body and was taken to hospital. The explosion was believed to have resulted from either aerosol cans or an industrial vacuum located at the car wash in the underground car park.
