= Ashfield Boys High School =

Location
- 117 Liverpool Road, Ashfield,, Sydney; Australia; 33°53′22″S 151°7′45″E

Information
- Type: Government-funded comprehensive single-sex secondary day school
- Motto: Here We Decide
- Established: 1962; 64 years ago
- School district: Canterbury; Regional South
- Educational authority: New South Wales Department of Education
- Oversight: NSW Education Standards Authority
- Principal: Dwayne Hopwood
- Teaching staff: 55.5 FTE (2023)
- Years: Year 7–12
- Gender: Boys
- Enrolment: 771 (2023)
- Campus: Suburban
- Colours: Grey, black and white
- Website: ashfieldbo-h.schools.nsw.gov.au

Ashfield Boys High School is a government-funded comprehensive single-sex secondary school for boys, located on Liverpool Road, in Ashfield, an Inner West suburb of Sydney, New South Wales, Australia.

Established in 1962, the school had 771 enrollments in 2023, of whom two percent identified as Indigenous Australians and 64 percent as being from a language background other than English. The school is operated by the NSW Department of Education in accordance with a curriculum developed by the New South Wales Education Standards Authority; the principal is Dwayne Hopwood. The High school had two names before Ashfield Boys High School, Ashfield Superior School and Ashfield Superior Technical School.

== History ==
Part of the school land area was once used by the Australian Army. The land (gym and sheds) have since been acquired by the school and the site rebuilt.

The Drill Hall was built in the 1800s and was home to the local citizen militia and other volunteer military units. In 1913, the land was acquired by the Department of Defence as the Ashfield Corps continued to grow. In 1915 it was the second to last stop for the Gilgandra Rifle Club on their Cooee March before 240 men were sent to war. In 1939, the Army sheds were built to house armoured vehicles (25 in total). The last company to be stationed at the depot were the 3 Company Royal Australian Army Service Corps Infantry Division, leaving in the 1960s.

=== Royal visit ===
On 4 November 2014, His Royal Highness Prince Edward, Duke of Edinburgh, then The Earl of Wessex, visited Ashfield Boys High School. The visit was to mark the 50th anniversary of The Duke of Edinburgh's Award in Australia. The Prince met with students from eight Sydney inner west schools.

== Notable alumni ==
- Allan Alaalatoa - Rugby Union player; played and captained for the Wallabies
- Craig Alexander – ironman; three-times Hawaiian Ironman world champion (2008, 2009 & 2011)
- Graeme Innes AM – Commissioner responsible for disability discrimination for the Human Rights and Equal Opportunity Commission
- Keaon Koloamatangi – South Sydney Rabbitohs rugby league player
- Salesi Ma'afu – rugby union player; played with the Wallabies
- Daniel Neurath – musician (Sticky Fingers)
- Dirk Wellham – cricketer; played with the Australia cricket team and captained the NSW cricket team
- Angus Young – lead guitarist for Australian rock band AC/DC, known for wearing the Ashfield Boys High School uniform on stage
- Malcolm Young – former rhythm guitarist for the Australian rock band AC/DC.

== See also ==
- List of government schools in New South Wales: A–B
