= Car brokers in Australia =

Car brokers specialise in helping car buyers source and buy cars. They typically offer services such as finding a particular used car model to fit a budget, getting the lowest price on a new car, or negotiating with a used car seller on behalf of a client that already located the car by themselves.

== History ==
There have been car brokers operating in Australia almost as long as there have been car dealers. Car dealers recognised that some individuals stood out in their circle of friends or community as experts on car buying. The dealers started offering them a spotters fee each time they would bring a customer to the dealership. If the customer bought the car, the broker (or spotter) would be paid.
After some time, a business model evolved where businesses would set up and call themselves motor brokers.

Motor brokers would typically be started by car sales people who wanted a change of lifestyle. They were almost exclusively one-person operations, and operated as de facto car dealers. They would be licensed as car dealers, and focus on achieving the best bottom line deal for the customer.

As the popularity of the Internet increased, the first pure online car brokers appeared around 2003. These car brokers are typified by the lack of a dealer's license, and only dealing in new cars. This minimises the labour component of the business and allows a high level of automation.
In spite of car brokers having been in existence for decades, general public awareness of them in Australia is relatively limited.

== Buying new cars ==
Car brokers work with their own established network of new car dealerships. When a client requires a new car, the car broker will contact one or more dealers in their network and determine which one will provide the required car at the lowest price. Delivery and location parameters may also be considered. Some car brokers offer to deliver the car to the client's home or place of work

== Buying used cars ==
Some car brokers can help source used cars as well as new ones. In many of these cases, the car broker will buy the car and then sell it to their client. Used car brokers are generally licensed. The reasons for having a dealer's license are:

- The car may be bought at an auction where private sellers cannot bid.
- The car may be sourced from a private seller, but the buyer must purchase from a licensed dealer due to financing requirements.
- Clients often prefer buying from a licensed dealer as statutory warranties apply in most cases.

Many clients buy used cars via brokers without first seeing the car.

== Other services ==
Other services provided by car brokers can include:

- Test drives. Using a car broker to arrange test drives removes the often stressful situation of having to go to a dealership and be subjected to a sales pitch while trying to evaluate a car.
- Financing. Typically, a finance broker will be aligned with the car broker to source discounted finance.
- Pre-approved finance.
- Cars are one of the most expensive depreciating assets people buy in their lives. It's a right of passage to adulthood when a person buys their first car, but many younger people can not usually afford a car. That's why people approach car financiers. Car Financiers lend money to allow accepted clients to purchase their next car sooner than they otherwise would, and work with the client to create a repayment plan. However interest rates do vary widely and arranging your own finance is often better.
- Extended warranties.
- Paint protection, rust protection, window tinting and other third party options and accessories.
- Car insurance.

== Regulations ==
Many car brokers disclose their referral fee (also called dealer fee) on their websites. These referral fees are usually minimal amounts also known as "spotter fees" and as dealers are not having to pay for extra advertising or staff costs they welcome the extra volume orders from their regular brokers.

== Alternatives ==
With Internet's popularity car brokers are becoming less common, being replaced by online classifieds/broker type systems. Broker fees have become listing fees, with some sites also charging a spotters fee when the deal has been sealed.
