= Sydney Private Hospital =

Geography
- Location: 63 Victoria Street, Ashfield, NSW, Australia
- Coordinates: 33°53′39″S 151°07′47″E

History
- Founded: 1931 (as the Masonic Hospital)

Links
- Website: The Sydney Private Hospital
- Lists: Hospitals in Australia

The Sydney Private Hospital is a private hospital located in the inner-western Sydney suburb of Ashfield, Australia. It is owned by Macquarie Health. The hospital opened in 1931 on the site of the former Fernleigh Rest Home, a pre and post maternity care institution for poor mothers. It operated as the NSW Masonic Hospital until it was sold in 2000. The hospital's maternity and emergency services closed at that time.

In 2020 a new rehabilitation wing was built including private rooms, medical gymnasium and upgrades to the patient hydrotherapy pool.

The hospital specialises in surgical and rehabilitation for inpatients and day patients.

This hospital is a part of Macquarie Health Australia. www.machealth.com.au
