= Federation of Automobile Dealers Associations of India =

Founded in 1964, the Federation of Automobile Dealers Associations (FADA), is the apex national body of Automobile Retail Industry in India engaged in the sale, service and spares of 2- and 3-wheelers, passenger cars, UVs, commercial vehicles (including buses and trucks) and tractors. FADA India represents over 15,000 automobile dealerships having over 30,000 dealership outlets including multiple Associations of Automobile Dealers at the regional, state and city levels representing the entire auto retail industry. Together they employ around 5 million people at dealerships and service centres.

FADA India also networks with industries and the authorities, both at the central and state levels, to provide its inputs and suggestions on auto policy, taxation, vehicle registration procedure, road safety, clean environment, etc. to sustain the growth of the automobile retail trade in India.

In 2017, Saharsh Damani was appointed as the first CEO of FADA.

FADA India appointed current president Manish Raj Singhania in 2022.
