= Richard A. Forsgren =

American politician

Member of the Wyoming House of Representatives
- In office 1963–1965

Personal details
- Born: July 22, 1923 Brigham City, Utah, U.S.
- Died: April 8, 1998 (aged 74) Tucson, Arizona, U.S.
- Party: Democratic
- Spouse: Clayta Christensen (m. 1947)

Richard A. Forsgren (July 22, 1923 – April 8, 1998) was an American politician. He served as a Democratic member of the Wyoming House of Representatives.

== Life and career ==
Forsgren was born in Brigham City, Utah. He attended Box Elder High School and West Texas State University.

In 1963, Forsgren was elected to the Wyoming House of Representatives, representing Sweetwater County, Wyoming, serving until 1965.

Forsgren died in April 1998 at the Northwest Hospital in Tucson, Arizona, at the age of 74.
