= Sumsion =

Sumsion is a surname. Notable people with the surname include:

- Herbert Sumsion (1899–1995), British organist
- Ken Sumsion, American politician
- Kyle Sumsion (born 1993), American rugby union player
- Stephen M. Studdert, American presidential advisor
- Terry Sumsion (1947-2011), Canadian country singer
