= Frischknecht =

Frischknecht is a surname. Notable people with the surname include:

- Andri Frischknecht (born 1994), Swiss cross-country mountain biker
- Blake Frischknecht (born 1995), American soccer player
- Hans Frischknecht (1922–2003), Swiss long-distance runner
- Hans Eugen Frischknecht (born 1939), Swiss composer, organist, choral conductor, and harpsichordist
- Lee Frischknecht (1928–2004), American broadcast journalist
- Paulo Frischknecht (born 1961), Portuguese swimmer
- Thomas Frischknecht (born 1970), Swiss mountain bike and cyclo-cross racer
