= Utah Designer Craftsmen =

Utah Designer Craftsmen was an artists' cooperative founded in 1960 by Dorothy Bearnson and Angelo Caravaglia. In 2000, it was renamed the Utah Designer Craft Alliance.

Since it was founded, UDC hosted annual competitive exhibitions, although they were not continuous, especially from the 1990s on. Some of the exhibitions were held at the Utah Art Barn.

During the 1980s, UDC had their own gallery, the Utah Designer Craftsmen Gallery, at 38 W. 200 South, in Salt Lake City, UT.

In 2016, the organization folded for good, donating remaining funds to the Brigham City Museum of Art & History to use for one final show, to be held in 2018 or 2019.

Artists who have been associated with UDC include Bruce Larrabee, Joseph Bennion, Susan Harris, Kathleen Royster, Steve Hansen, Larry Elsner, and many others.
