= Allan F. Packer =

American religious leader, entrepreneur, and missionary

Allan Forrest Packer
- Born: July 7, 1948 (age 77); Brigham City, Utah
- Occupations: Religious leader, businessman

Allan Forrest Packer (born 7 July 1948) is an American religious leader and entrepreneur. He is a general authority of the Church of Jesus Christ of Latter-day Saints (LDS Church). A descendant of Mormon pioneers, he is the son of Boyd K. Packer, a former president of the Quorum of the Twelve Apostles.

== Biography ==
=== Origins and family ===
Allan Packer is a descendant of Mormon pioneers on both his paternal and maternal sides. His family's connections to Brigham City date back to the early settlement of Utah. His paternal great-great-grandfather, Jonathan Taylor Packer, was part of the second group of migrants to arrive in the Great Salt Lake Valley in 1847 and settled in Brigham City in 1860. His paternal great-grandmother, Christina Sundby Packer, ran a cooperative city store in Brigham City. On his mother's side, his great-grandfather, Rasmus Julius Smith, was one of the Danish immigrants who reached the Salt Lake Valley in 1854 and contributed to the construction of the Logan Utah Temple.

Allan was born in Brigham City, Utah, to Boyd Kenneth Packer and Donna Edith Smith Packer. Allan grew up in a large family with nine siblings. His father served for many years in the highest ranks of the LDS Church, which deeply connected Allan’s family to church structures.

=== Education, professional career, and social activity ===
Allan Packer studied electrical engineering at Brigham Young University (BYU), graduating in 1973. His business career included positions at companies such as Boeing, Eaton-Kenway, and Auto Soft. He also served on the boards of O.C. Tanner, MyFamily.com, and iLumin.

He was active in the Boy Scouts of America, holding various positions in the Great Salt Lake Council. For his contributions, he was awarded the Silver Beaver Award. He also chaired the Little Cottonwood Creek Community Council.

=== LDS Church service ===
Allan Packer served in various callings within the LDS Church. He served as a missionary in the Andes Mission, which at the time covered Peru, Ecuador, and Colombia. He served as a high councilor, bishop, counselor in a stake presidency, and as president of the church's Spain Málaga Mission. He was also a member of the Young Men General Board, and worked in the church's missionary department as a field representative.

==== General Authority ====
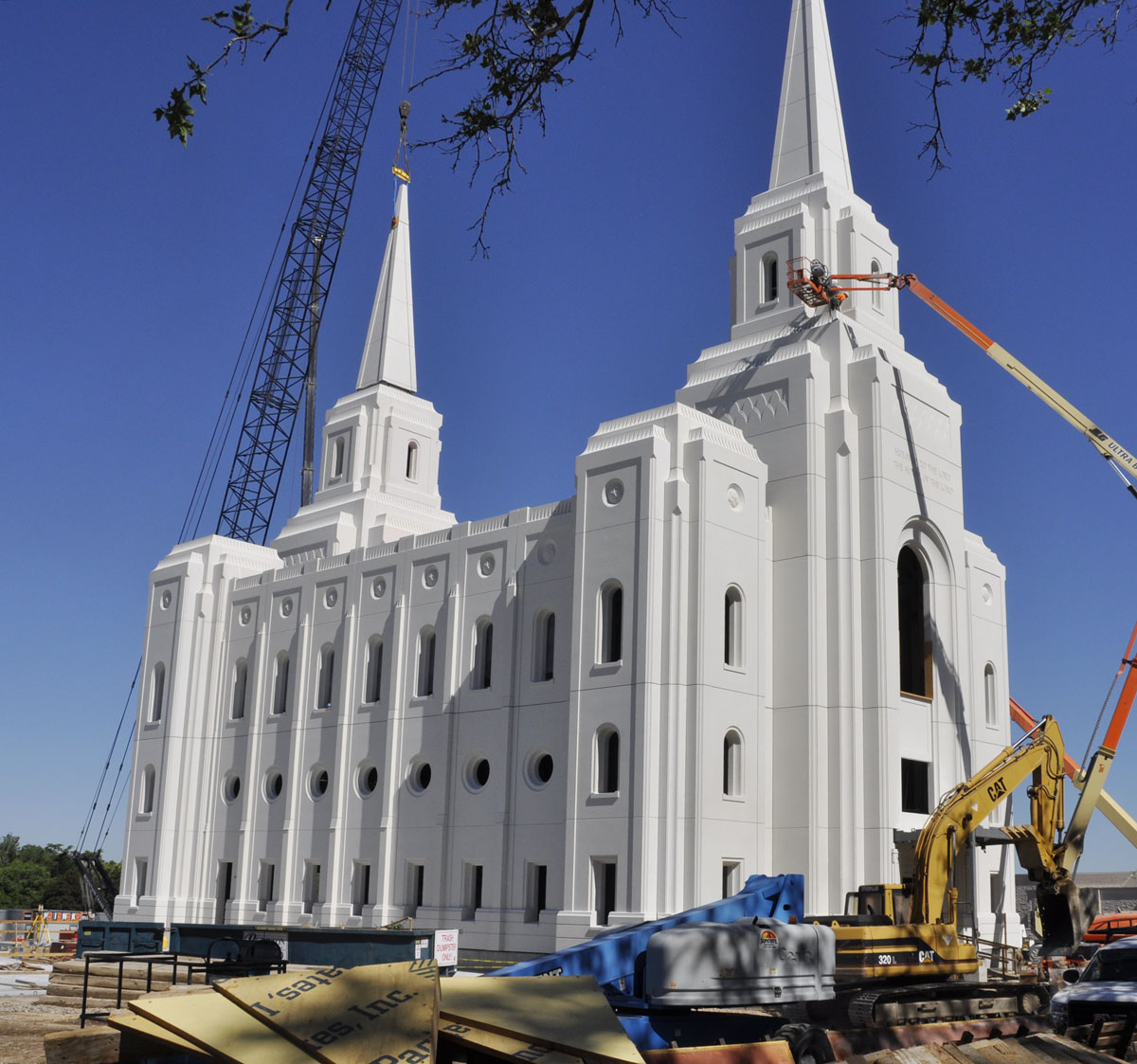
Mormon temple in Brigham City, Allan F. Packer's hometown

On 5 April 2008, Packer was sustained as an LDS Church general authority. His calling as a general authority created discussions of nepotism within church leadership. During his tenure, he was part of the presidency of the church's South America South Area, serving as first counselor starting in 2016. He was also the both an assistant executive director and then executive director of the church's Family History Department.

Packer spoke twice during general conferences, April 2009 and October 2014. He emphasized the importance of temple work and genealogical research, framing them as integral to personal religious practice. He highlighted that family history efforts are not merely about documenting ancestry but should be viewed as essential components of worship, akin to sacrament meetings, prayer, and scripture study. He urged members to actively seek out and submit the names of ancestors for temple ordinances, linking this effort directly to exaltation – the ultimate goal of Latter-day Saint religious life.

In a 2013 address at an annual conference on genealogy and family history, he explored the benefits of genealogical work, discussing doctrinal, personal, and societal aspects. Speaking to BYU students in 2016, he encouraged them to maximize their mortal experience by developing skills, wisdom, courage, and confidence, aligning this potential with the divine nature of humanity and God's literal fatherhood.

=== Personal life ===
On 1 June 1970, Allan F. Packer married Terri Anne Bennett in the Salt Lake Temple. They are the parents of eight children.
