= Box Elder Stake Tabernacle =

Historic church in Utah, United States

- U.S. National Register of Historic Places
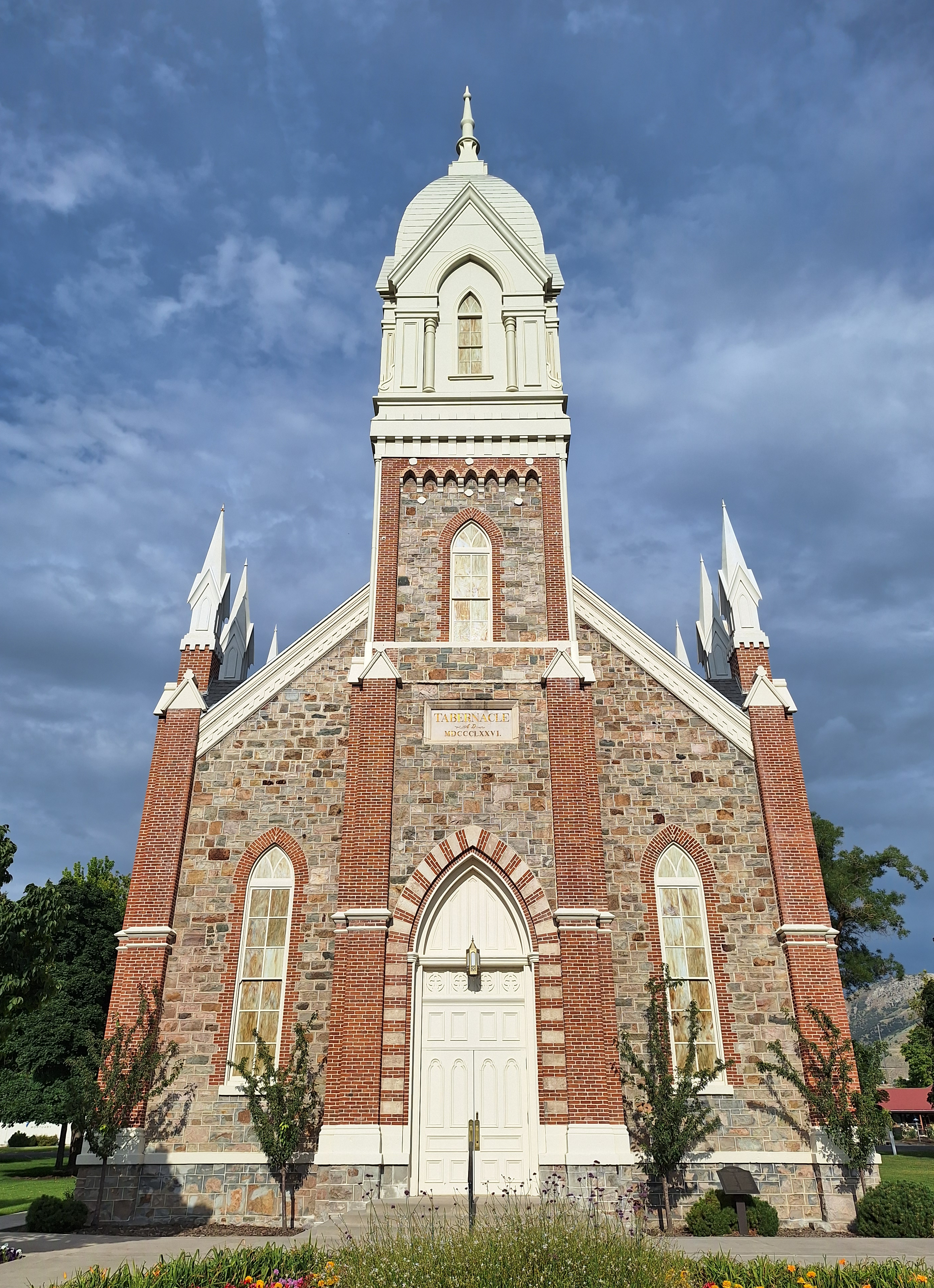

- Location within Utah Location within the United States
- Location: Main St. between 2nd and 3rd South Sts., Brigham City, Utah
- Coordinates: 41°30′20″N 112°0′51″W
- Built: 1897
- Architect: Drafted by Truman O. Angell
- NRHP reference No.: 71000840
- Added to NRHP: May 4, 1971

The current Box Elder Stake Tabernacle, also known as the Brigham City Tabernacle, is a neo-Gothic tabernacle of the Church of Jesus Christ of Latter-day Saints rebuilt in Brigham City, Box Elder County, Utah by Mormon pioneers in 1897 after being gutted by fire a year earlier. The tabernacle continues to function as a meetinghouse for congregants of the Box Elder Stake and seats approximately 1,600. It also hosts concerts and other special events and is open for tours during the summer. Given its unique architecture and importance to the community, the tabernacle was listed on the National Register of Historic Places on May 14, 1971. The temple, built in 2012, stands across from the tabernacle.

== Original structure ==
The site for the tabernacle was chosen by LDS Church President Brigham Young, who after visiting a different site selected by local church officers, went atop "Sagebrush hill" the highest point along main street and reportedly stated "this is the spot for your tabernacle." On May 8, 1865, Young and Utah Territorial Surveyor Jesse Williams Fox Sr (1819-1894) laid its cornerstones. On May 27, 1879, meetings began to be held in the partially-completed structure. In 1889, it was voted to "complete" the building by adding its tower, gallery, rear vestibule, capped brick buttresses, and other improvements. The tabernacle was completed and dedicated on October 28, 1890 by Young's successor, Wilford Woodruff.

== Fire and rebuilding ==
The tabernacle was gutted by fire in 1896, just 6 years after being completed in 1890. On Sunday February 9, 1896, as church members began to assemble a fire broke out in the furnace room, the building ignited and was reduced to blackened stone walls. Within a year the tabernacle was rebuilt with elegant woodwork, a distinctive gothic-revival tower and sixteen graceful pinnacles, and dedicated by George Q. Cannon on March 21, 1897.

== Renovations ==
In 1951 an organ from the Reuter Organ Company was installed. On April 12, 1987, LDS apostle Boyd K. Packer, who was born & raised in Brigham City, rededicated the tabernacle after extensive renovations.

In 2012 the grounds were re-landscaped along with the construction of the Brigham City Utah Temple, and a new media center was put in as a kind of visitors center.

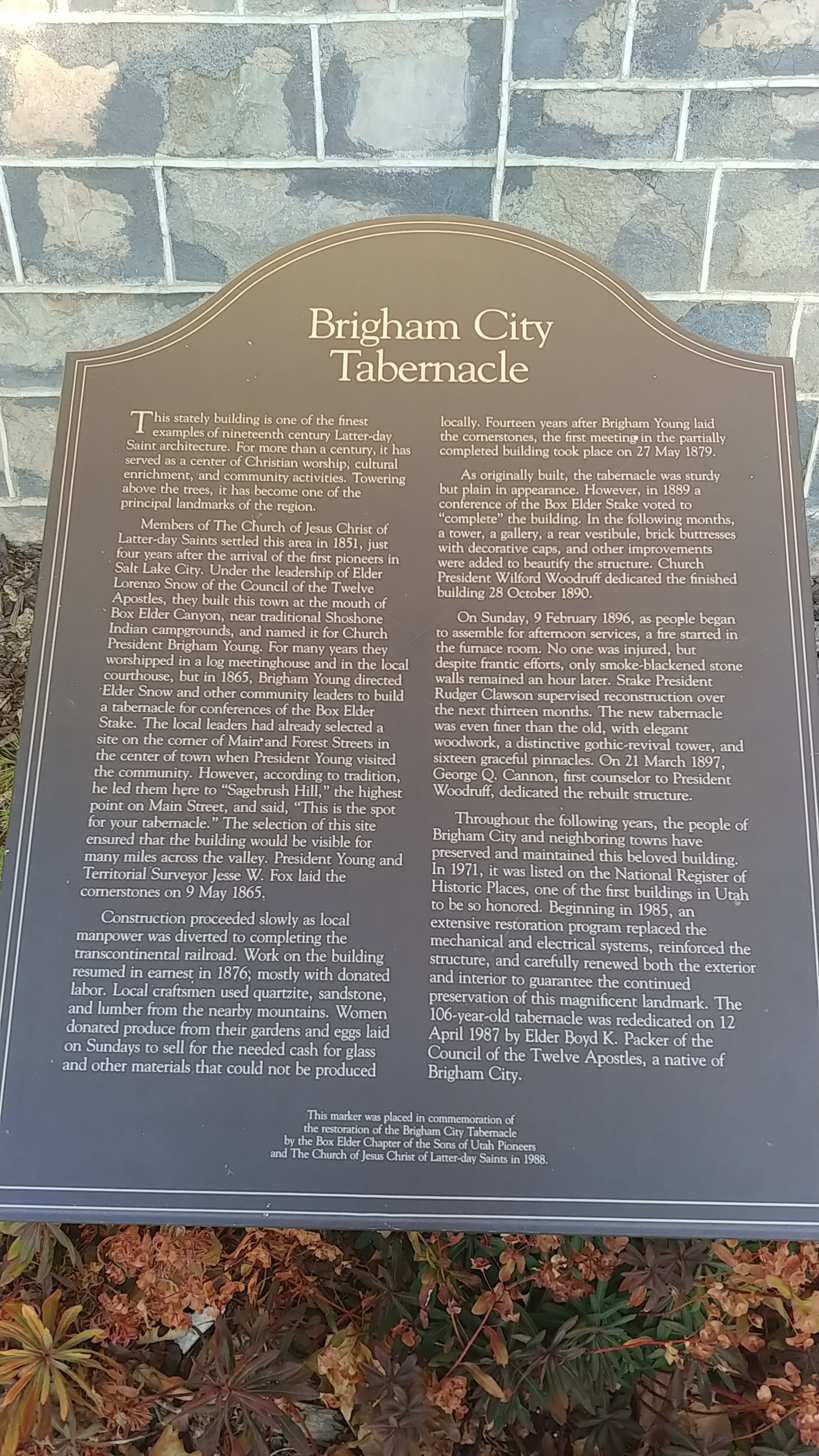
Tabernacle sign

== See also ==
- Brigham City Utah Temple
