= Marc Dunn =

American football player (born 1978)

Profile
- Position: Quarterback

Personal information
- Born: April 27, 1978 (age 48); Oakland, California
- Listed height: 6 ft 4 in (1.93 m)
- Listed weight: 205 lb (93 kg)

Career information
- College: Ricks (2000); Kansas State (2001–2002)
- NFL draft: 2003: undrafted

Career history
- Kansas City Chiefs (2003)*; Berlin Thunder (2004)
- * Offseason or practice squad member only

Marc Dunn (born April 27, 1978, in Oakland, California) is a former NFL and NFL Europe football player. He played college football at Kansas State University.

== Early life ==
Dunn grew up in Brigham City, Utah, and graduated from Box Elder High School in the class of 1996. In football, he lettered three seasons and started for two. During the 1995 season Dunn was team captain and rushed for 650 yards and 12 touchdowns and threw for 2,349 yards and 24 touchdown, leading his team to the 4-A State Football Championship. Dunn was named team MVP, All Region, All State and All Area First-team; Utah 4-A MVP, All-American Honorable Mention, and won the Stephen M. Josephson Memorial Award as an Outstanding Athlete, Scholar and Citizen. He also lettered three times in track and twice in basketball.

== College career ==
=== Ricks ===
After a Mormon mission in Santiago, Chile (1996–1998), he was the starting Quarterback for Ricks College, in Rexburg, Idaho (1999–2000). Dunn threw for 4,351 yards and 42 touchdowns (against 17 interceptions) during the 2000 season and was named the 2000 National Junior College Athletic Association Offensive Player of the Year. During that season he broke the NJCAA all-time passing record (4,001 yards) as well as eight school records: passes completed in a game (34), most yards passing in a game (605), most TDs in a game (8), most passing yards in a season (4,351), most yards total offense in a season (4,237), most TD passes in a season (42), most passes attempted in a season (464) and most passes completed in a season (281). In 2001 Dunn was awarded the David Rowlands award, given to the 2001 NJCAA Male Student-Athlete of the Year.

=== Kansas State ===
At the conclusion of the 2000 season he transferred to Kansas State University, in Manhattan, Kansas where he played through the 2001 and 2002 seasons. He chose KSU over BYU, Arizona State University, and the University of Houston. Dunn was named to the second-team academic all-big 12 team as a quarterback for Kansas State University in 2001.

== Professional career ==
=== Kansas City Chiefs ===
Following his college career, Dunn signed with the Kansas City Chiefs as a free agent after going undrafted in the 2003 NFL draft.

=== Berlin Thunder ===
After being released from the Chiefs, Dunn signed with the Berlin Thunder in NFL Europe and played during the 2004 season, which was the most successful in club history with an NFL Europe League-best 9–1 regular season record, culminating in a 30–24 defeat of the Frankfurt Galaxy in World Bowl XII.

== Personal life ==
Parents are Richard and Deon Dunn, father played football at Brigham Young University. Married to the former Elizabeth May.
