= Oliver G. Snow =

American politician

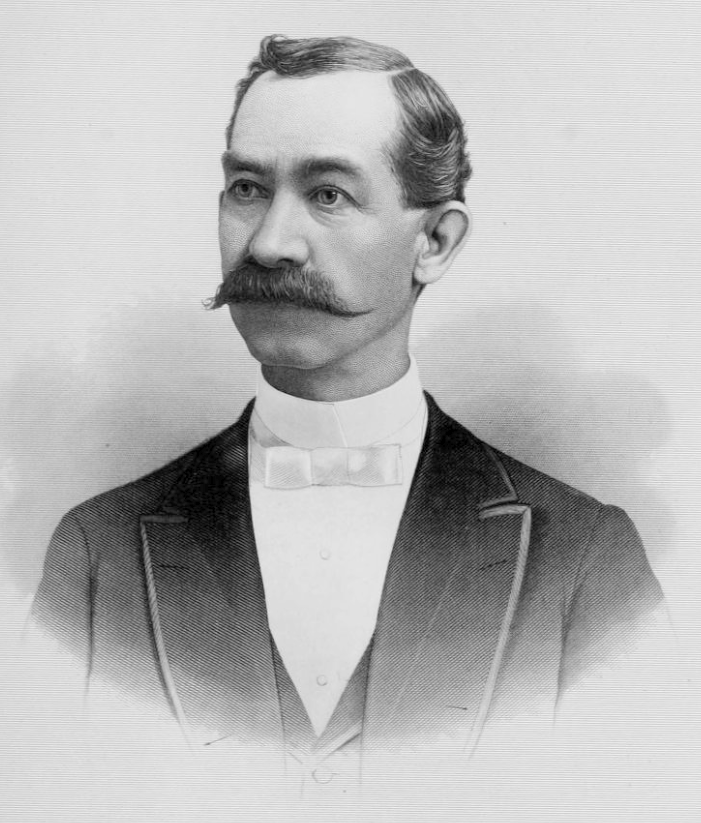

Member of the Utah Territorial Legislature
- In office 1880–1886
- Constituency: Box Elder County

Personal details
- Born: Oliver Goddard Snow; February 20, 1849; Salt Lake City, Utah
- Died: August 13, 1931 (aged 82); Los Angeles, California
- Spouse: Mary B. Peirce (m. 1873)
- Parents: Lorenzo Snow (father); Adeline Goddard (mother)
- Education: University of Deseret
- Occupation: Missionary, politician
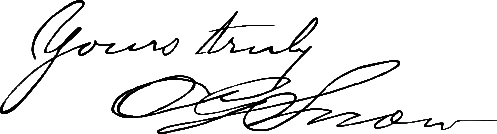
- Signature

Oliver Goddard Snow (February 20, 1849 – August 13, 1931) was a member of the Utah Territorial Legislature.

== Biography ==
Snow was born to Lorenzo Snow and his wife Adeline Goddard. He was born in Salt Lake City but at a fairly young age moved with his parents to Brigham City, Utah, where his father was the leading authority in the Church of Jesus Christ of Latter-day Saints (LDS Church).

Snow worked on building the transcontinental railroad. He then studied for a time at the University of Deseret (the predecessor of the University of Utah) under John R. Park. From 1870 to 1873, Snow served as a missionary for the LDS Church in the United Kingdom. In October 1873, he married Mary B. Peirce.

In 1875, Snow served another mission, this time in the Eastern States Mission, based in New York City. In 1877, when the Box Elder Stake of the LDS Church was organized, encompassing all of Box Elder County, Utah, and headquartered in Brigham City, Snow was made the stake president, in many ways succeeding his father who had been essentially functioning like a stake president. Snow was released as stake president in 1888. From 1880 to 1886, he served as a member of the Utah Territorial Legislature from Box Elder County.

Snow died in Los Angeles, California on August 13, 1931.
