= Peter C. Knudson =

American politician (1937–2024)

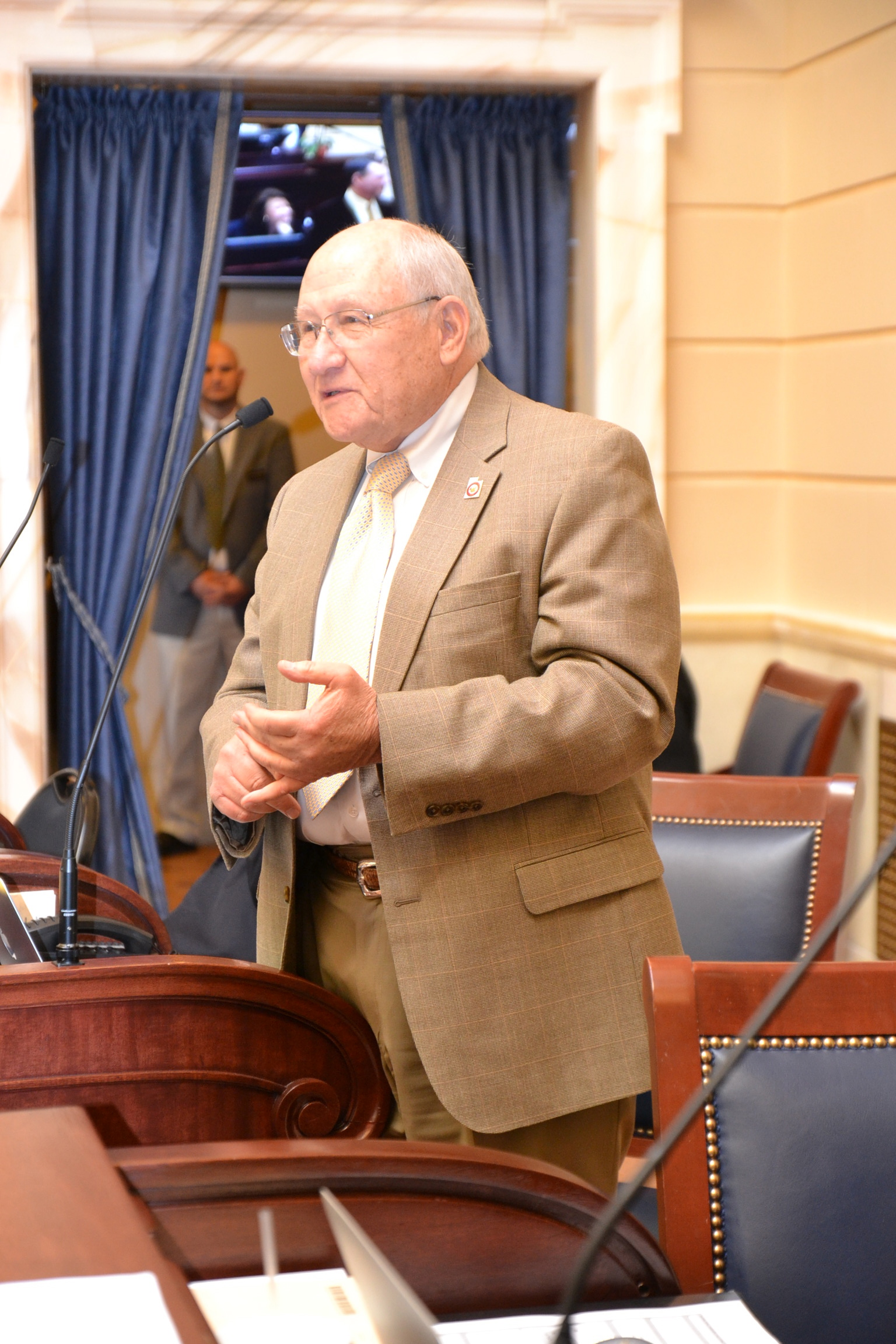
- Knudson in 2013

Member of the Utah Senate from the 17th district
- In office January 20, 2003 – January 1, 2019
- Preceded by: Bill Wright
- Succeeded by: Scott Sandall

Member of the Utah Senate from the 24th district
- In office January 20, 1999 – January 20, 2003
- Preceded by: John P. Holmgren
- Succeeded by: Leonard Blackham

Member of the Utah House of Representatives from the 2nd district
- In office January 1, 1995 – December 31, 1998
- Preceded by: Rob Bishop
- Succeeded by: Ben Ferry

36th Mayor of Brigham City
- In office January 3, 1978 – January 5, 1990
- Preceded by: Harold B. Felt
- Succeeded by: Clark N. Davis

Member of the Brigham City Council
- In office 1974–1978
- Preceded by: Rudolph M. Kaiser
- Succeeded by: Robert C. Valentine

Personal details
- Born: October 26, 1937 Brigham City, Utah, U.S.
- Died: June 9, 2024 (aged 86)
- Party: Republican
- Spouse: Georgianna
- Children: 4
- Occupation: Orthodontist

Peter Charles Knudson (October 26, 1937 – June 5, 2024) was an American politician. A Republican, he was a member of the Utah State Senate, representing the state's 17th senate district in Box Elder, Cache and Tooele Counties including Brigham City until 2019.

== Biography ==
Knudson was born in Brigham City, Utah, on October 26, 1937. He started his career in the military. He was a Colonel in the United States Army Reserve. Knudson has an A.S. from Weber State University, his B.S. from Utah State University, his D.D.S. from University of the Pacific's Arthur A. Dugoni School of Dentistry, his M.S. from Loyola University and a Certificate of Specialty in Orthodontics, School of Dentistry, Orthodontics, Loyola University. Knudson met his wife, Georgie, in their senior year at the University of Utah. She was engaged to someone else, and he was going steady. After they had terminated their previous relationships, friends introduced them again and they began seeing each other. Georgie attended Stanford University after finishing at the University of Utah while Knudson attended dental school at the College of Physicians and Surgeons in San Francisco. By the end of their first quarter, they were engaged and they were married at the end of the school year in 1963. They have four children.

Knudson worked as an orthodontics specialist at the University of Utah at the Greenwood clinic.

Knudson died June 5, 2024, at the age of 86.

== Background and affiliations ==
- Brigham City Mayor (1978–1990)
- Brigam City Council (1974–1978)
- State Job Training Coord. Council (chair, 1992–1994)

Knudson worked as an orthodontist for many years. Throughout his career, he won many awards including the Distinguished Service Award from the Utah Dental Association. He also served on a number of dentistry and orthodontic boards, including the following:

- Diplomat, American Board of Orthodontics
- Fellow International College of Dentists
- Fellow American College of Dentists, Utah Association of Orthodontists (past president)
- Rocky Mountain Association of Orthodontists
- American Association of Orthodontists
- American Dental Association
- College of Diplomats of the American Board of Orthodontists
- Pierre Fauchard Academy
- Utah Dental Association

== Political career ==
Knudson started his political career on the Brigham City Council from 1974 to 1978. He then served as the 36th Mayor of Brigham City from 1978 to 1990. He was elected to the House of Representatives and served there from January 1, 1995, to December 31, 1998. He was elected to the Senate in 1998. Throughout his political career he also served on the Utah League of Cities and Towns as president and the National League of Cities on the Board of Directors and advisory council. The Utah League of Cities and Council named Knudson the Most Outstanding Elected Public Official. Peter Knudson won reelection in 2014 against two challengers, one Democrat, and one member of the Constitution Party. He won 75% of the vote. In 2016, Knudson served as the Assistant Majority Whip. In 2016 he was also on the following committees:

- Executive Appropriations Committee
- Infrastructure and General Government Appropriations Subcommittee
- Natural Resources, Agriculture, and Environmental Quality Appropriations Subcommittee
- Senate Economic Development and Workforce Services Committee
- Senate Ethics Committee (Chair)
- Senate Natural Resources, Agriculture, and Environment Committee
- Senate Rules Committee
- Senate Health and Human Services Committee

=== Election ===
==== 2014 ====
2014 Utah State Senate election District 24
Party	Candidate	Votes	%
Republican	Peter Knudson	14,431	74.7%
Democratic	Scott Totman	2,949	15.3%

== Legislation ==
=== 2016 sponsored bills ===
Bill number and title	Bill status
S.B. 18 Workforce Services Job Listings Amendments	Governor Signed 3/23/2016
S.B. 35 Veteran License Plates Amendments	Governor Signed 3/18/2016
S.B. 53 Veteran's Definition Amendments	Governor Signed 3/23/2016

=== Notable legislation ===
As Knudson is a former military man himself, he has been the primary and floor sponsor to many bills which help veterans. In 2014, Knudson floor sponsored House Bill 275, which officially designates March 29 as Vietnam War Memorial Day. During the 2016 legislative session Senator Knudson passed a veteran's license plate bill that allows veterans to display a license plate indicating the campaign or theater in which the veteran served.
