= Larry L. Richman =

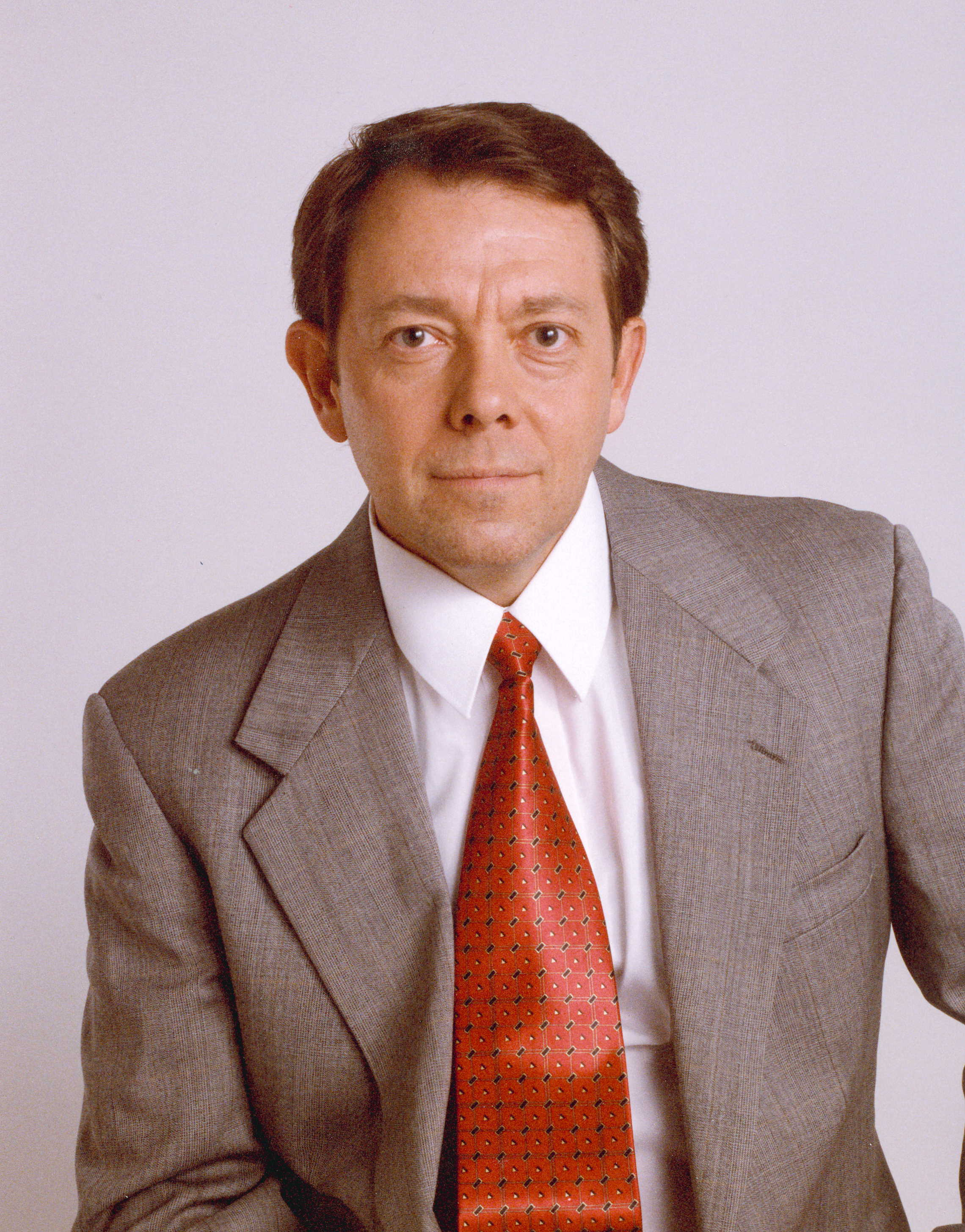
- Richman is the author of several books on project management.
- Born: 1955 (age 70–71); Brigham City, Utah, U.S.
- Website: larryrichman.org

Larry L. Richman (born 1955) is a social media expert, Internet strategist, publishing executive, project management trainer, and author of books, book translations, and articles in professional journals and magazines. He is a translator in three languages.

== Online strategist and social media professional ==
Richman is an online strategist with a specialty in using social media in product marketing. He is the former director of communications for the Church of Jesus Christ of Latter-day Saints (LDS Church) to market the church's materials to members and leaders worldwide.

Since 2006, he has written daily articles at LDSMediaTalk.com and LDS365.com, his professional blog about LDS Church materials and using social media and technology responsibly.

Richman directed the content and services of LDS.org, coordinating with all the LDS Church's websites, such as Mormon.org, FamilySearch.org, JosephSmith.net, and JesusChrist.lds.org. He was the domain portfolio manager of the church’s web properties and web pages. LDS Church websites are visited by over 50 million people each month Richman directed a redesign and rebuild of LDS.org from 2004-2007, implementing XML, metadata and taxonomy standards, a content management system, web portal server technology, new web search tools, and a strategy for Search Engine Optimization.

== Project management ==
Richman is a certified PMP (Project Management Professional), consultant, and trainer. He has authored seven books on project management, including two college texts.

Richman directed the Publications and Media Project Office that manages the creation of 8,000 printed, media, and web products a year in up to 185 languages. This included managing the projects for writing, editing, translation, production, printing, and international distribution in 105 offices worldwide.

== Publishing ==
Richman directed the processes and systems for print and web publishing at the LDS Church.

He is the president and CEO of Century Publishing, a custom media publisher based in Salt Lake City, Utah.

== Author and speaker ==
He has authored several dozen books, several book translations (in English, Spanish, and Cakchiquel), and has published articles in professional journals and magazines.

Books

- Richman, Larry (2014) [2014]. 101 Ways to Hasten the Work Online. Salt Lake City: Century Publishing. ISBN 9780941846264.
- Richman, Larry L. (2013) [2013]. Talk About Saving Money: How to Save on Food, Utilities, Car Expenses, Mortgage, and Health Care. Salt Lake City: Century Publishing. ISBN 9780941846202.
- Richman, Larry L. (2012) [2006]. Improving your Project Management Skills (2nd ed.). New York: American Management Association. ISBN 9780814417294. OCLC 738439397.
- —— (2011). Successful Project Management (3rd ed.). New York: American Management Association. ISBN 9780761215189. OCLC 755719401.
- Richman, Larry L. (2007) [2007]. Learning Through Life's Trials. Salt Lake City: Century Publishing. ISBN 9780941846172.
- —— (2002). Project Management Step-by-Step. New York: American Management Association. ISBN 0814407277. OCLC 48966644.
- —— (1996). Project Management: a Strategic Approach. Salt Lake City, Utah: Richman Publishing. ISBN 0941846040. OCLC 36596511.
- Richman, Larry (1984) [1984]. Tales of the Cakchiquels: Trilingual Collection of Folklore from the Cakchiquel Indians of Guatemala. ISBN 0941846016.
- Richman, Larry L., ed. (1983). Prominent Men and Women of Provo. Salt Lake City, Utah: Richman Publishing. ISBN 0941846008. OCLC 10659452.
- Richman, Larry (1981) [1981]. Diccionario Español-Cakchiquel-Inglés. New York and London: Garland Publishing]. ISBN 0824092775.

Articles

- Richman, Larry (Fall 1982). "An Examination of Adjectival Forms in the Cakchiquel Language". Journal of Mayan Linguistics. 3 (2). Department of Anthropology, University of Iowa.
- Richman, Larry (March 2010). "Learning through Life's Trials". Ensign. 40 (3). url=https://www.churchofjesuschrist.org/study/ensign/2010/03/learning-through-lifes-trials?lang=eng.
- Richman, Larry (March 1980). "Learning a Second Language: A Challenge Older People Can Handle". Deseret Language and Linguistic Society Proceedings. Brigham Young University.
- Syndicated author for Meridian Magazine with over 125 published articles.

Speaker

- National speaker on self-help topics and technology issues.
