= Brigham City, Utah =

City in Utah, United States

- City
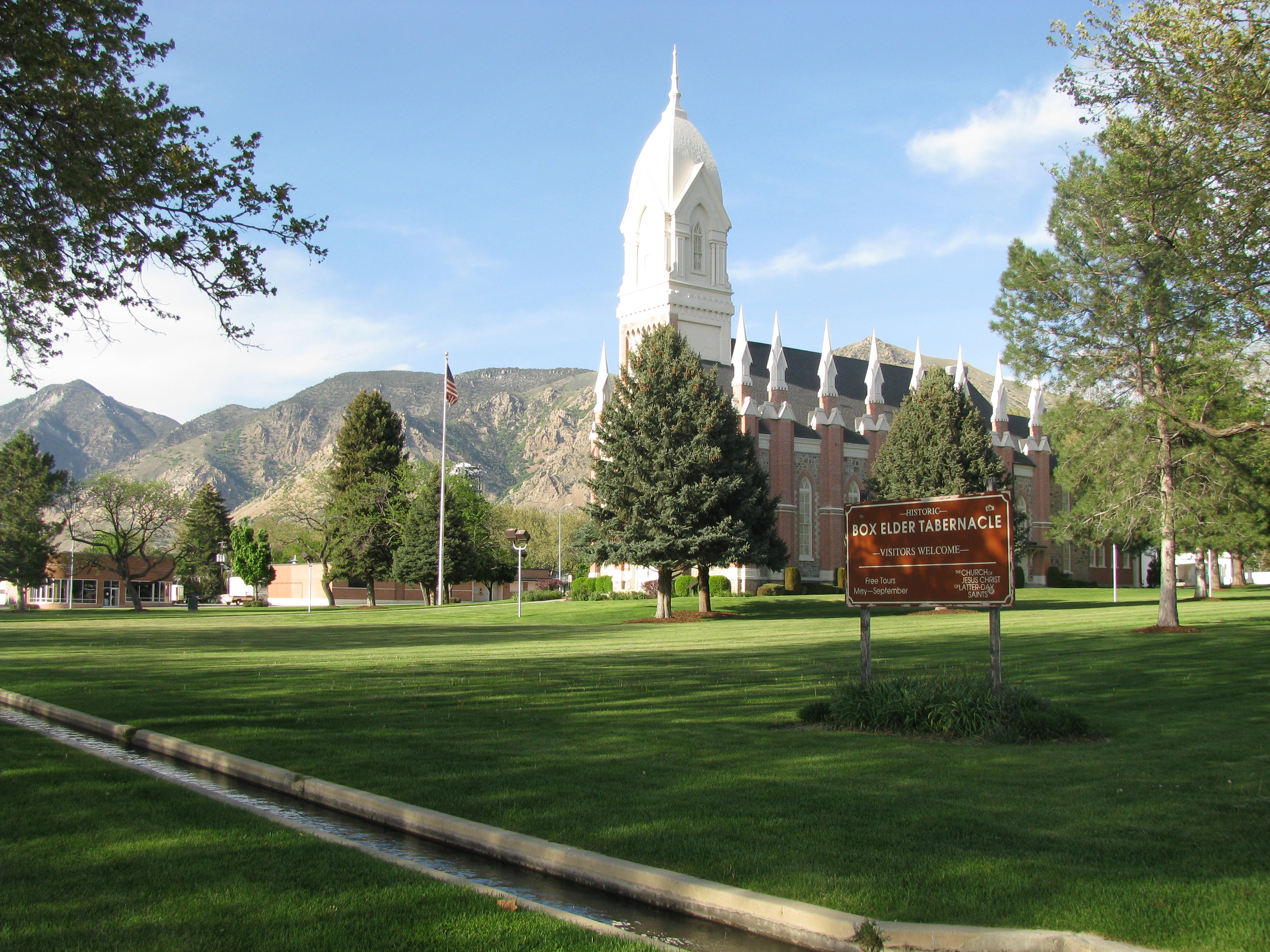
- The Box Elder Stake Tabernacle is one of 29 sites in or near Brigham City listed on the National Register of Historic Places

- Logo

- Location in Box Elder County and the state of Utah

- Location of Utah in the United States
- Coordinates: 41°30′10″N 112°02′20″W
- Country: United States
- State: Utah
- County: Box Elder
- Settled: 1851
- Named for: Brigham Young

Area
  - Total: 24.92 sq mi (64.54 km^{2})
  - Land: 24.58 sq mi (63.67 km^{2})
  - Water: 0.34 sq mi (0.88 km^{2})
- Elevation: 4,232 ft (1,290 m)

Population (2020)
  - Total: 19,650
  - Density: 799.3/sq mi (308.6/km^{2})
- Time zone: UTC−7 (MST)
  - Summer (DST): UTC−6 (MDT)
- ZIP code: 84302
- Area code: 435
- FIPS code: 49-08460
- GNIS feature ID: 2409910
- Website: www.bcutah.gov

Brigham City is a city in Box Elder County, Utah, United States. The population was 19,650 at the 2020 census, up from the 2010 figure of 17,899. It is the county seat of Box Elder County. It lies on the western slope of the Wellsville Mountains, a branch of the Wasatch Range at the western terminus of Box Elder Canyon. It is near the former headquarters of ATK Thiokol, now Northrop Grumman, the company that created the solid rocket boosters for the Space Shuttle.

Brigham City is known for its peaches and holds an annual celebration called Peach Days on the weekend after Labor Day. Much of Main Street is closed off to cars, and the festival is celebrated by a parade, a car show, a carnival, and other activities.

The Church of Jesus Christ of Latter-day Saints (LDS Church) dedicated its fourteenth temple in Utah in Brigham City on September 23, 2012. Brigham City is home to the Golden Spike State Historical Monument and one of the nine regional campuses of Utah State University.

The city is the headquarters of the Northwestern Band of the Shoshone Nation, a federally recognized tribe of Shoshone people.

== History ==
Latter-Day Saint pioneer William Davis first explored the Brigham City area in 1850. He returned with his family and others a year later to create permanent homes. Brigham Young directed Lorenzo Snow to lead additional settlers to the site and foster a self-sufficient city at the site in 1853.

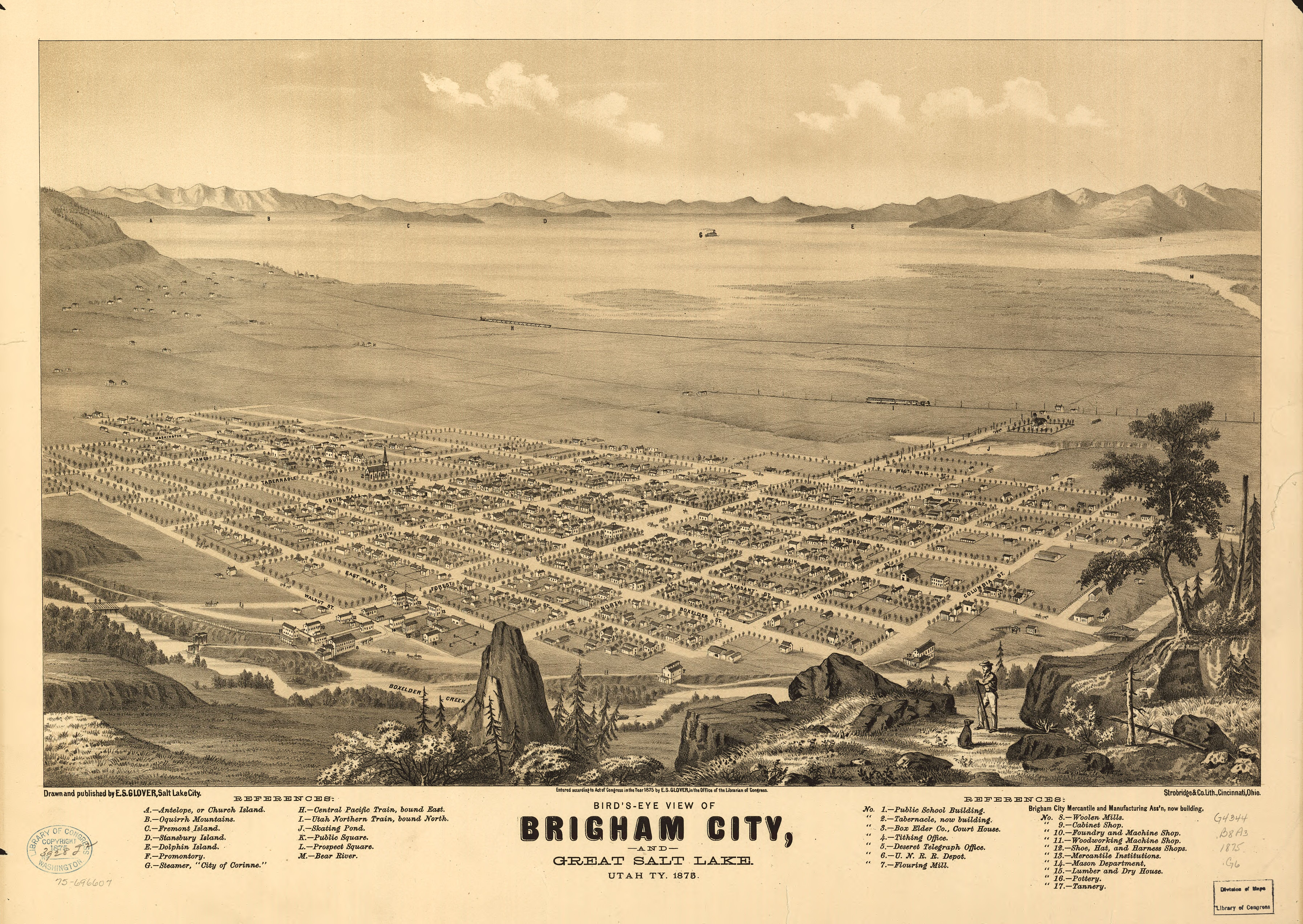
Panoramic map of Brigham City from 1875

Snow directed both religious and political affairs in the settlement, eventually naming it Box Elder in 1855. When the town was incorporated on January 12, 1867, the name was changed to Brigham City in honor of Brigham Young. That same month, after the Utah legislature authorized a municipal election, residents elected Chester Loveland to be the town's first mayor. Brigham Young gave his last public sermon there in 1877 shortly before his death. In 1864, the cooperative movement began in earnest with the creation of a mercantile co-op store and was an important element of the United Order. Other industries were added, and the Brigham City Co-op is widely recognized as the most successful of the Latter-Day Saint Co-op ventures. Economic hardships brought an end to the Co-op in 1895, though the Co-op had first started selling businesses off in 1876.

World War II brought a major economic boost to the city. The federal government created Bushnell General Hospital on Brigham City's south side to treat soldiers wounded in the war. Locals sold supplies and food to the hospital while hospital staff patronized local businesses. After the war, the hospital's buildings were used as Intermountain Indian School. Many young Native Americans attended the boarding school until it closed in 1984, although the Intermountain "I" on the mountain is still visible in tandem with Box Elder High School's "B". The facility has left its mark in a number of other ways, with most of the buildings still standing. Some have been converted into businesses and condos, while others remain empty. Utah State University purchased the site and demolished all remaining buildings in 2013. The Utah State University Brigham City regional campus will be expanded to permanent buildings on this site and will mainly serve students from Box Elder, Weber, and Davis counties. Construction will begin in the fall of 2014.

Despite layoffs over the past decade, much of Brigham City's economy relies on Thiokol, the creator of many missiles, as well as the solid rocket booster for the Space Shuttle. Additionally, the local Autoliv (formerly a part of Thiokol) airbag plants also net Brigham City many jobs. Nucor Corporation has two facilities in Brigham City, in addition to its steel mill nearby Plymouth. The addition of a Walmart distribution center in nearby Corinne has also brought new jobs.

=== Historic sites ===
==== Baron Woolen Mills ====
Built in 1870 as part of the Brigham City Manufacturing and Mercantile Association, the mill produced high-quality blankets and sweaters from locally produced wool fleeces. It was damaged by a blaze in June 2014 and destroyed by a fire on July 20, 2015.

==== Cooley Memorial Hospital ====
Dr. A.D. Cooley opened this hospital in 1935. It operated as the only acute care facility in Brigham City until 1976, when the Brigham City Community Hospital opened.

==== Hotel Brigham ====
Originally built to house transient railroad workers, rooms in Hotel Brigham were meant to be inexpensive. Very few rooms had bathrooms. An original owner was James Knudson, a former mayor of Brigham City. His grandson, Cameron Kay Harmon, became a part owner and managed the hotel after World War II and into the 1950s.

==== Brigham City Archway Sign ====
Installed on 6 September 1928, this sign was financed by citizen donations totaling $2,400. The sign spans the width of Main Street, welcoming visitors to the business district. Made of opalite glass, the 12-inch-high (30 cm) lettering states "Gateway to the World's Greatest Wild Bird Refuge."

==== Brigham City Cemetery ====
Established in 1853 with the burial of a pioneer infant, the Brigham City cemetery contains above-ground grave markers. The cemetery contains the graves of pioneers, peach orchard farmers, cholera epidemic victims, workers, and others.

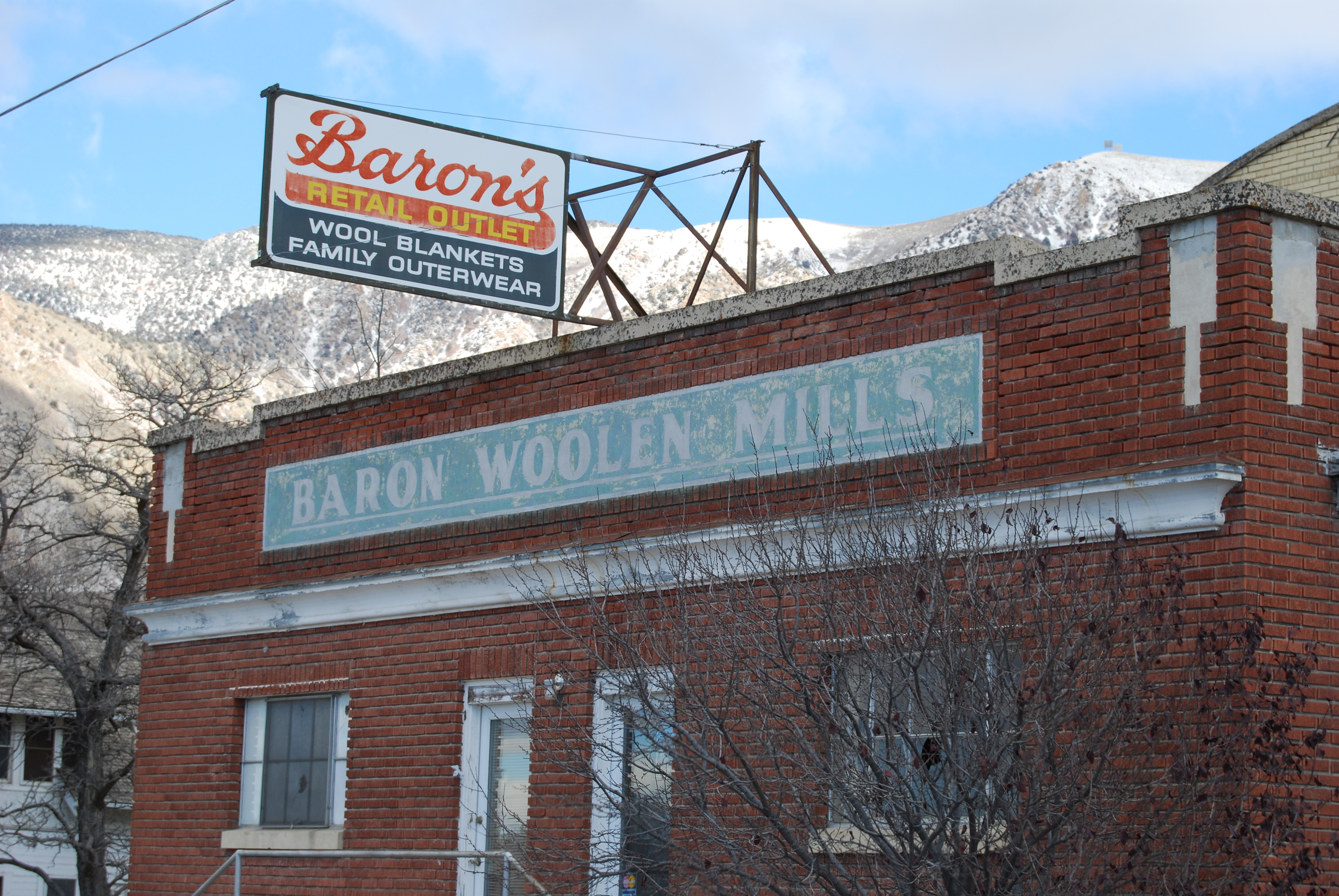
Baron Woolen Mills, 2007

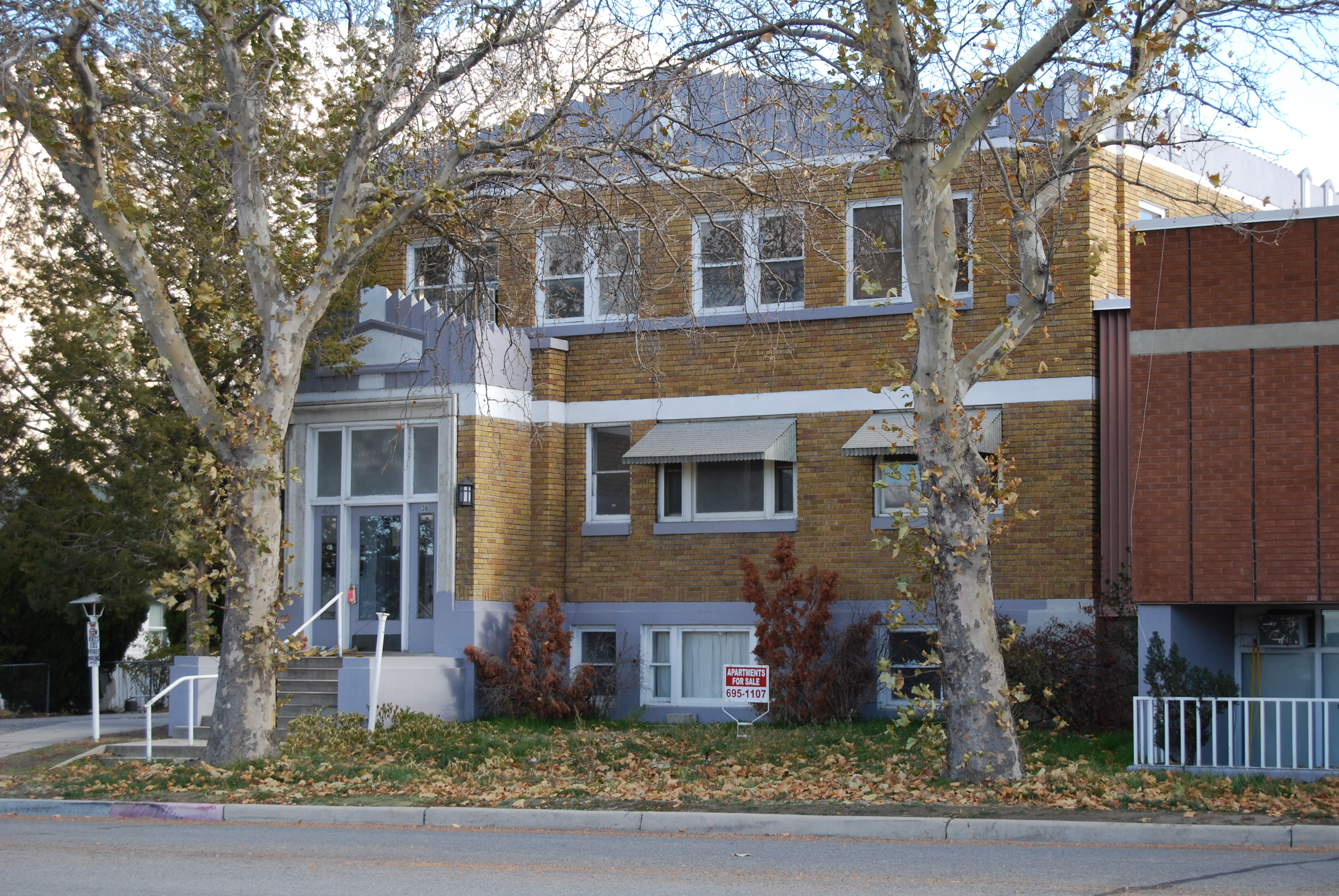
Cooley Memorial Hospital, 2007

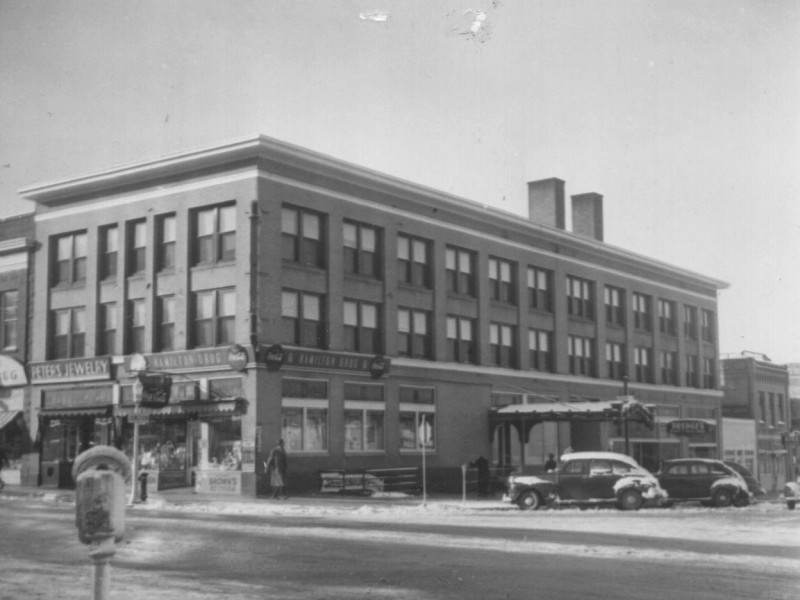
Hotel Brigham, 1946

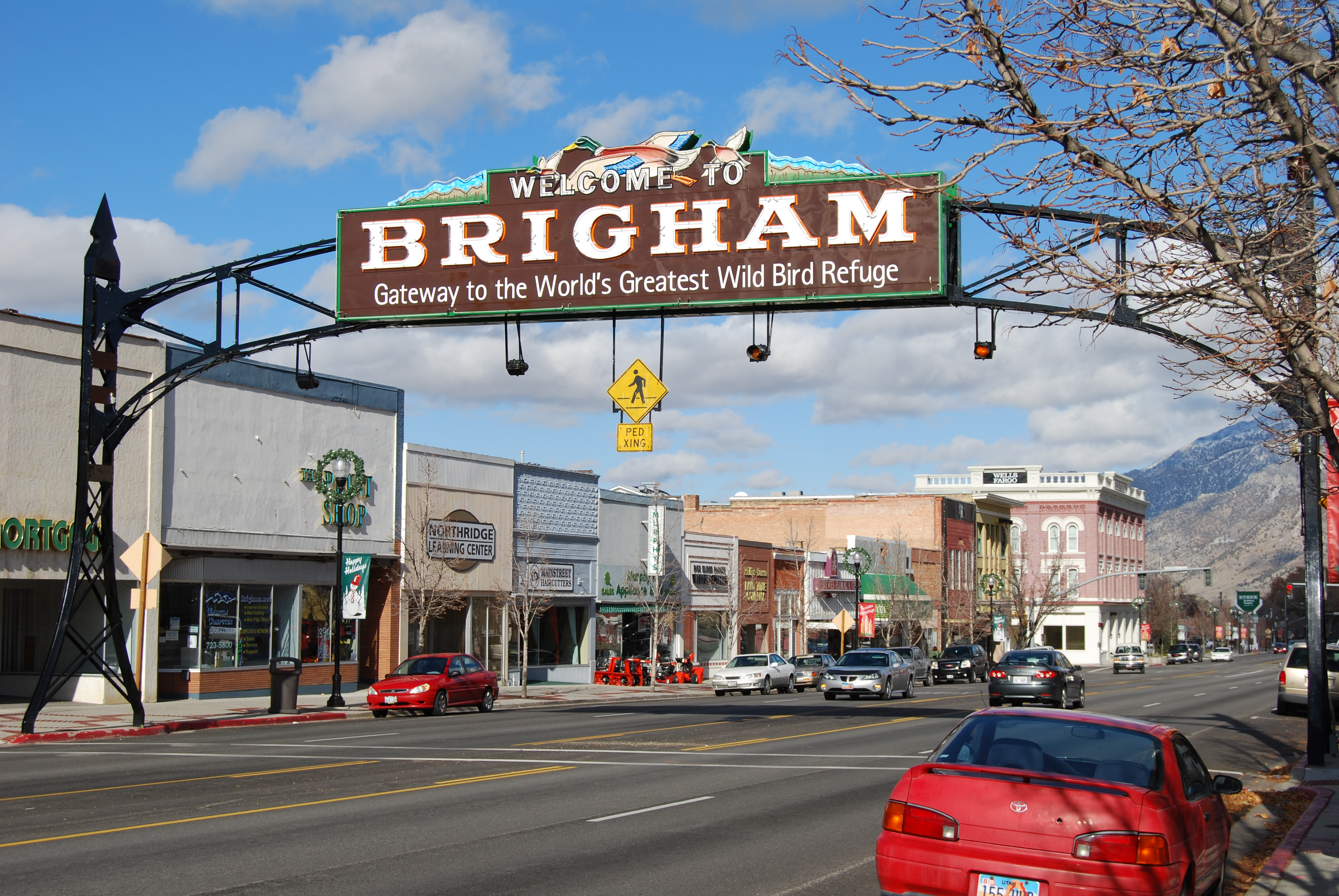
Archway

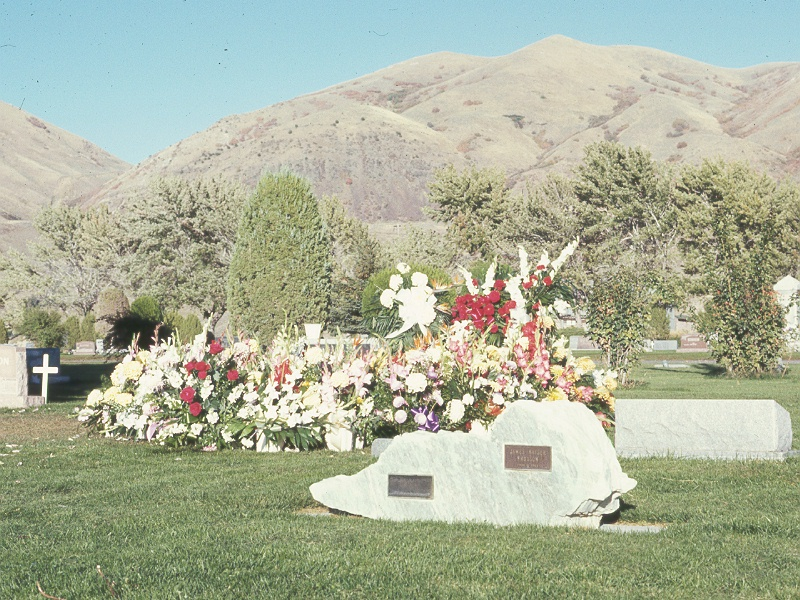
Brigham City Cemetery, 1969

=== List of mayors ===
| No. | Mayor | Term |
|---|---|---|
| 1 | Chester Loveland | 1867–1875 |
| 2 | John D. Rees | 1875–1878 |
| 3 | Samuel Smith | 1879–1883 |
| 4 | Adolph Madsen | 1882–1891 |
| 5 | Joseph M. Jenson | 1891–1893 |
| 6 | John D. Peters | 1895–1895 |
| 7 | William L. Wight (acting) | 1895–1895 |
| 8 | Jonah Mathias | 1895–1897 |
| 9 | John F. Erdmann | 1898–1900 |
| 10 | Heber C. Boden | 1900–1904 |
| 11 | Christian Holst | 1904–1908 |
| 12 | Thomas H. Blackburn | 1908–1912 |
| 13 | Robert L. Fishburn, Jr. | 1912–1914 |
| 14 | William T. Davis | 1914–1916 |
| 15 | John F. Erdmann | 1916–1918 |
| 16 | John W. Peters | 1918–1922 |
| 17 | N. Chris Simonsen | 1922–1924 |
| 18 | James Knudson | 1924–1926 |
| 19 | Hervin Bunderson | 1926–1928 |
| 20 | Abel S. Rich | 1928–1930 |
| 21 | James E. Halverson | 1930–1932 |
| 22 | Lorenzo W. Anderson | 1932–1934 |
| 23 | J. Wesley Horsley | 1934–1936 |
| 24 | Roy T. Shaw (acting) | 1936–1937 |
| 25 | Francis J. Law | 1937–1940 |
| 26 | Alf L. Freeman | 1940–1942 |
| 27 | Carl Wold | 1942–1946 |
| 28 | Rulon Baron | 1946–1948 |
| 29 | Lorenzo J. Bott | 1948–1954 |
| 30 | C. LeGrande Horsley | 1954–1958 |
| 31 | Ruel M. Eskelsen | 1958–1962 |
| 32 | Willis L. Hansen | 1962–1966 |
| 33 | Olof E. Zundel | 1966–1973 |
| 34 | Wayne A. Jensen (acting) | 1973–1974 |
| 35 | Harold B. Felt | 1974–1978 |
| 36 | Peter C. Knudson | 1978–1990 |
| 37 | Clark N. Davis | 1990–1998 |
| 38 | David T. Kano | 1998–2002 |
| 39 | Lou Ann Christensen | 2002–2010 |
| 40 | Dennis Fife | 2010–2014 |
| 41 | Tyler Vincent | 2014–2022 |
| 42 | Dennis "DJ" Bott | 2022–present |

== Geography ==
Brigham City lies in southeastern Box Elder County on the western slopes of the Wellsville Mountains, a branch of the Wasatch Range, at the western end of Box Elder Canyon. Brigham City is generally considered to be the northern end of the Wasatch Front. To the west is a large, flat region of desert scrub, eventually giving way to marshlands on the edge of the Great Salt Lake. Interstates 15 and 84 pass to the west of the city together. U.S. 89 approaches from the south and U.S. 91 comes from I-15/84 to the west. They intersect in the city, climbing through Box Elder Canyon together. Two routes of the Utah Transit Authority's bus system also provide access to Brigham City from Ogden, and it also has a Greyhound bus stop. It is planned to be the northern terminus of the FrontRunner commuter rail line by 2020.

According to the United States Census Bureau, the city has a total area of 24.2 square miles (62.6 km^{2}), of which 23.8 square miles (61.7 km^{2}) is land and 0.35 square miles (0.9 km^{2}), or 1.40%, is water. It lies at an elevation of 4,315 feet (1,315 m).

The climate of Brigham City is generally similar to that of the rest of the Wasatch Front, though slightly cooler. According to the Köppen climate classification, Brigham City has a humid continental climate (Dsa). Snow is heavy in winter with an annual average of 38.3 inches (97 cm), although it is too far north to receive lake-effect snow. Precipitation is light, averaging 15.49 inches (393 mm) annually. Summers are hot, but humidity remains low and overnight temperatures are cool, and winters are cold (but rarely frigid). May is the wettest month, while July is the driest.

Climate data for Brigham City, Utah (Brigham City Waste Plant), 1991–2020 normals, extremes 1974–present
| Month | Jan | Feb | Mar | Apr | May | Jun | Jul | Aug | Sep | Oct | Nov | Dec | Year |
|---|---|---|---|---|---|---|---|---|---|---|---|---|---|
| Record high °F (°C) | 60 (16) | 66 (19) | 76 (24) | 85 (29) | 94 (34) | 101 (38) | 106 (41) | 102 (39) | 96 (36) | 92 (33) | 73 (23) | 66 (19) | 106 (41) |
| Mean maximum °F (°C) | 48.0 (8.9) | 54.9 (12.7) | 68. (20) | 76.9 (24.9) | 85.1 (29.5) | 93.2 (34.0) | 98.2 (36.8) | 96.1 (35.6) | 90.4 (32.4) | 79.4 (26.3) | 64.0 (17.8) | 52.1 (11.2) | 98.6 (37.0) |
| Mean daily maximum °F (°C) | 36.4 (2.4) | 42.5 (5.8) | 54.0 (12.2) | 61.5 (16.4) | 71.3 (21.8) | 81.9 (27.7) | 91.0 (32.8) | 89.2 (31.8) | 79.2 (26.2) | 64.8 (18.2) | 49.6 (9.8) | 37.6 (3.1) | 63.3 (17.3) |
| Daily mean °F (°C) | 27.2 (−2.7) | 32.4 (0.2) | 42.3 (5.7) | 48.8 (9.3) | 57.5 (14.2) | 66.2 (19.0) | 74.3 (23.5) | 72.4 (22.4) | 62.8 (17.1) | 50.3 (10.2) | 38.3 (3.5) | 28.7 (−1.8) | 50.1 (10.0) |
| Mean daily minimum °F (°C) | 18.1 (−7.7) | 22.4 (−5.3) | 30.7 (−0.7) | 36.0 (2.2) | 43.8 (6.6) | 50.4 (10.2) | 57.5 (14.2) | 55.7 (13.2) | 46.4 (8.0) | 35.9 (2.2) | 26.9 (−2.8) | 19.8 (−6.8) | 37.0 (2.8) |
| Mean minimum °F (°C) | 1.1 (−17.2) | 5.4 (−14.8) | 17.4 (−8.1) | 24.6 (−4.1) | 30.2 (−1.0) | 37.8 (3.2) | 46.9 (8.3) | 43.6 (6.4) | 33.3 (0.7) | 22.7 (−5.2) | 12.3 (−10.9) | 3.7 (−15.7) | −3.4 (−19.7) |
| Record low °F (°C) | −22 (−30) | −23 (−31) | 3 (−16) | 15 (−9) | 23 (−5) | 30 (−1) | 35 (2) | 34 (1) | 15 (−9) | 6 (−14) | −3 (−19) | −25 (−32) | −25 (−32) |
| Average precipitation inches (mm) | 1.53 (39) | 1.23 (31) | 1.54 (39) | 1.69 (43) | 2.04 (52) | 1.13 (29) | 0.39 (9.9) | 0.61 (15) | 1.27 (32) | 1.60 (41) | 1.07 (27) | 1.39 (35) | 15.49 (392.9) |
| Average snowfall inches (cm) | 12.2 (31) | 7.5 (19) | 4.2 (11) | 1.2 (3.0) | 0.0 (0.0) | 0.0 (0.0) | 0.0 (0.0) | 0.0 (0.0) | 0.0 (0.0) | 0.5 (1.3) | 4.1 (10) | 8.6 (22) | 38.3 (97.3) |
| Average precipitation days (≥ 0.01 in) | 8.6 | 7.7 | 7.6 | 8.3 | 8.6 | 4.0 | 2.3 | 3.2 | 5.0 | 6.1 | 6.5 | 7.9 | 75.8 |
| Average snowy days (≥ 0.1 in) | 5.3 | 3.4 | 1.7 | 0.6 | 0.0 | 0.0 | 0.0 | 0.0 | 0.0 | 0.3 | 1.3 | 4.2 | 16.8 |
Source 1: NOAAall-time extreme temperature
Source 2: National Weather Service

== Demographics ==
Historical population
| Census | Pop. | Note | %± |
|---|---|---|---|
| 1860 | 975 | | — |
| 1870 | 1,315 | | 34.9% |
| 1880 | 1,877 | | 42.7% |
| 1890 | 2,139 | | 14.0% |
| 1900 | 2,859 | | 33.7% |
| 1910 | 3,685 | | 28.9% |
| 1920 | 5,282 | | 43.3% |
| 1930 | 5,093 | | −3.6% |
| 1940 | 5,641 | | 10.8% |
| 1950 | 6,790 | | 20.4% |
| 1960 | 11,728 | | 72.7% |
| 1970 | 14,007 | | 19.4% |
| 1980 | 15,596 | | 11.3% |
| 1990 | 15,644 | | 0.3% |
| 2000 | 17,412 | | 11.3% |
| 2010 | 17,899 | | 2.8% |
| 2020 | 19,650 | | 9.8% |
U.S. Decennial Census

=== 2020 census ===
As of the 2020 census, Brigham City had a population of 19,650. The median age was 33.4 years. 29.4% of residents were under the age of 18 and 14.9% of residents were 65 years of age or older. For every 100 females there were 99.6 males, and for every 100 females age 18 and over there were 96.7 males age 18 and over.

98.1% of residents lived in urban areas, while 1.9% lived in rural areas.

There were 6,801 households in Brigham City, of which 37.0% had children under the age of 18 living in them. Of all households, 55.8% were married-couple households, 16.2% were households with a male householder and no spouse or partner present, and 23.7% were households with a female householder and no spouse or partner present. About 23.7% of all households were made up of individuals and 10.6% had someone living alone who was 65 years of age or older.

There were 7,041 housing units, of which 3.4% were vacant. The homeowner vacancy rate was 0.7% and the rental vacancy rate was 3.7%.

Racial composition as of the 2020 census
| Race | Number | Percent |
|---|---|---|
| White | 16,701 | 85.0% |
| Black or African American | 85 | 0.4% |
| American Indian and Alaska Native | 277 | 1.4% |
| Asian | 124 | 0.6% |
| Native Hawaiian and Other Pacific Islander | 49 | 0.2% |
| Some other race | 971 | 4.9% |
| Two or more races | 1,443 | 7.3% |
| Hispanic or Latino (of any race) | 2,406 | 12.2% |

=== 2000 census ===
As of the census of 2000, there were 17,411 people, 5,526 households, and 4,409 families residing in the city. The population density was 1,216.4 people per square mile (469.8/km^{2}). There were 5,838 housing units at an average density of 407.9 per square mile (157.5/km^{2}). The racial makeup of the city was 91.26% White, 0.24% African American, 1.63% Native American, 0.77% Asian, 0.10% Pacific Islander, 4.07% from other races, and 1.93% from two or more races. Hispanic or Latino of any race were 7.67% of the population.

There were 5,526 households, out of which 44.7% had children under the age of 18 living with them, 66.4% were married couples living together, 9.7% had a female householder with no husband present, and 20.2% were non-families. 18.0% of all households were made up of individuals, and 8.2% had someone living alone who was 65 years of age or older. The average household size was 3.09 and the average family size was 3.53.

In the city, the age distribution of the population shows 34.2% under the age of 18, 11.1% from 18 to 24, 25.2% from 25 to 44, 17.4% from 45 to 64, and 12.1% who were 65 years of age or older. The median age was 29 years. For every 100 females, there were 100.9 males. For every 100 females age 18 and over, there were 96.9 males.

The median income for a household in the city was $42,335, and the median income for a family was $46,891. Males had a median income of $39,271 versus $22,061 for females. The per capita income for the city was $15,503. About 7.3% of families and 8.7% of the population were below the poverty line, including 9.7% of those under age 18 and 7.1% of those age 65 or over.

=== Religion ===
- Latter-day Saint - 80.5%
- Unaffiliated - 14.4%
- Protestant - 2.9%
- Catholic - 2.1%
- Other - 0.2%

== Arts and culture ==
Brigham City has museums covering the area's art and history (the Brigham City Museum-Gallery) and natural history (the Box Elder Museum). There is an LDS tabernacle in downtown Brigham City, as well as a temple. Nearby attractions include Golden Spike National Historic Site, which lies northwest of the city near Promontory Summit. State Route 13 heads northwest from Brigham City and turns north at Corinne. However, State Route 83 continues west from there and eventually reaches Lampo Junction, where the turnoff to the historic site is located. The work of art known as the Spiral Jetty lies west-southwest of this site. The Bear River Migratory Bird Refuge lies directly west of Brigham City on the northeast side of the Great Salt Lake at the mouth of the Bear River.

=== Festivals ===
- Brigham City Arts Festival
- Fourth of July Celebration
- Brigham City Peach Days

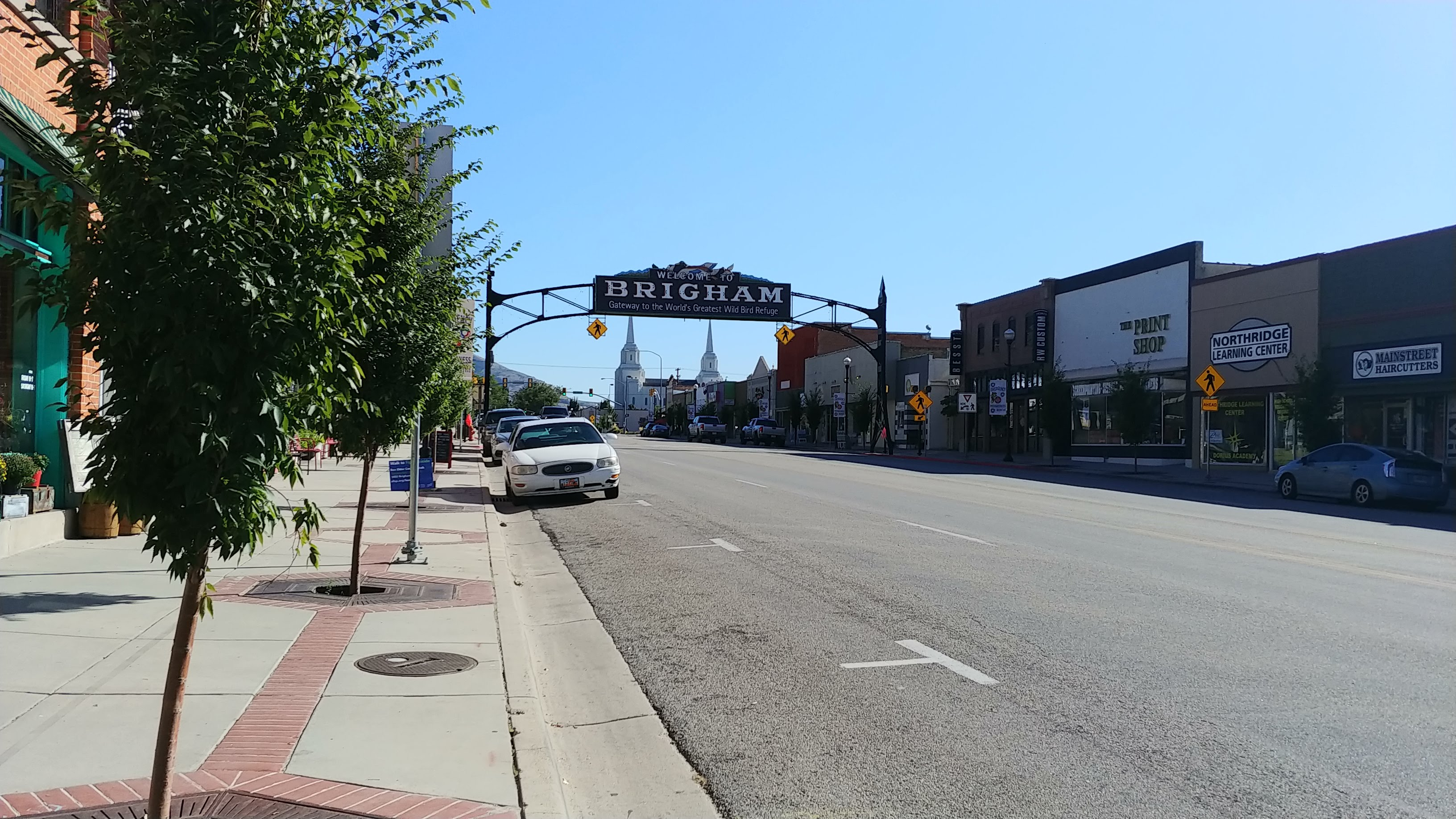
Downtown Brigham City sign over Main Street

== Education ==
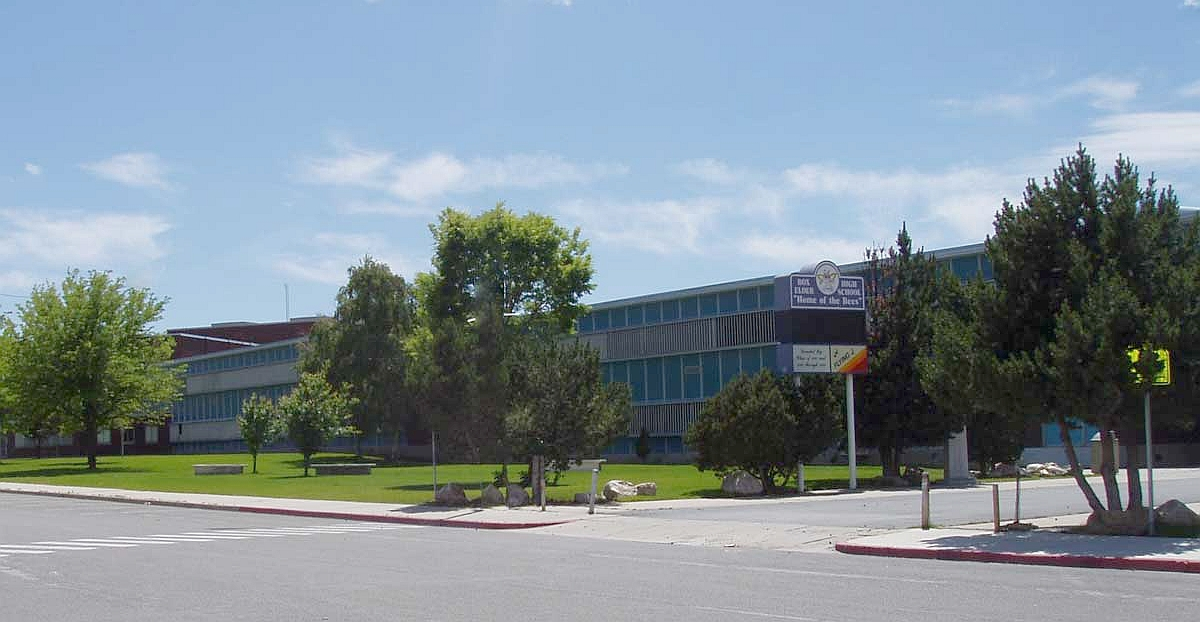
Box Elder High School

=== Public schools ===
Brigham City is part of the Box Elder School District. Schools include:

- Box Elder High School (Grades: 10 - 12)
- Sunrise High School (Alternative Grades: 10 - 12)
- Box Elder Middle School (Grades: 8 - 9)
- Adele C. Young Intermediate School (Grades: 6 - 7)
- Discovery Elementary School (Grades: K - 5)
- Lake View Elementary School (Grades: K - 5)
- Golden Spike Elementary School (Grades: Pre - 5)

=== Post secondary ===
Utah State University-Brigham City and Bridgerland Technical College are located in Brigham City.

== Notable people ==
Politics:

- Rob Bishop, former member of United States House of Representatives
- Peter C. Knudson, former member of the Utah State Senate
- Steve Christiansen, member of the Utah House of Representatives
- Joseph Howell, former member of the United States House of Representatives
- Delpha Baird, former member of the Utah State Senate
- Richard A. Forsgren, former member of the Wyoming House of Representatives
- D. Lowell Jensen, American jurist and former U.S. district judge
- Lee Perry, former member of the Utah House of Representatives
- Oliver G. Snow, former member of the Utah Territorial Legislature
- Stephen M. Studdert, White House staff Advisor of Presidents George H. W. Bush, Reagan, and Ford.
- Pat Takasugi, former member of the Idaho House of Representatives

Religious Leaders:

- Lorenzo Snow, fifth president of the Church of Jesus Christ of Latter-day Saints
- Boyd K. Packer, President of the Quorum of Twelve Apostles of the LDS Church
- Charles W. Nibley, presiding bishop of LDS Church, member of church's First Presidency
- William J. Critchlow, Jr., general authority of LDS Church
- Allan F. Packer, general authority of LDS Church
- John E. Forsgren, missionary
- Alexander Neibaur, first Jew to join the LDS Church

Art:

- Lew Christensen, ballet dancer and choreographer; director of San Francisco Ballet during 1950s
- Willam Christensen, founder of Ballet West and San Francisco Ballet
- Portia Nelson, Broadway singer
- Garth Smith, pianists/composer/musician
- Nephi Anderson, author
- Gail Bird and Yazzi Johnson, Native American artists who produce collaborative jewelry
- Allan House, Chiricahua Apache sculptor, painter, and book illustrator
- Zig Jackson, Native American photographer

Education:

- Paul R. Cheeseman, Brigham Young University professor
- Robert S. Nelsen, eighth President of California State University, Sacramento.
- Benjamin M. Ogles, dean of Ohio University and Brigham Young University College of Family, Home and Social Sciences.

Businessmen:

- Lorenzo Hoopes, executive for Safeway.

Athletes:

- Marc Dunn, former NFL and NFL Europe football player
- Chris Pella, college football coach
- Julián Vázquez, professional footballer
- Devin Durrant, former professional basketball player
- Elmer Ward, American football player

Tech:

- Larry L. Richman, directs publishing, websites, and social media for LDS Church
- Lee Frischknecht, broadcast journalist

Science:

- George Smooth Horsley, physicist
- George Lorenzo Zundel, mycologist, phycologist, and plant patollis

Veterans:

- Chase Nielson, former officer in the U.S. Air Force

== In popular culture ==
Brigham City was the namesake of American movie director, producer, writer, and actor Richard Dutcher's 2001 film Brigham City about murder in a fictitious small Mormon town, although it is not actually about the real Brigham City. Due to geography and population, the movie was actually filmed some 120 miles to the south in Mapleton, Utah.

Movies that have scenes filmed in Brigham City include The Work and the Story, Species, and Clay Pigeons.

The LDS Church President Brigham Young, for whom Brigham City is named, gave his final public address in the city. He gave this address in a public square that is now home to the Brigham City Museum-Gallery.

== See also ==
- List of cities and towns in Utah
- Brigham City Airport
- Brigham City Utah Temple
- Smith's Food and Drug
