= Zig Jackson =

Native American photographer (born 1957)

- Born: January 16, 1957 (age 69); Fort Berthold Indian Reservation, North Dakota, U.S.
- Other name: Rising Buffalo
- Citizenship: Mandan, Hidatsa, and Arikara Nation; United States
- Education: Northeastern Oklahoma State University (BS); San Francisco Art Institute (MFA)
- Occupation: Photographer
- Website: www.zigjackson.com

Zig Jackson (born January 16, 1957) is a Native American (Mandan/Hidatsa/Arikara) photographer.

== Early life and education ==
Jackson was born on the Fort Berthold Indian Reservation in North Dakota on January 16, 1957. He is an enrolled member of the Mandan, Hidatsa, and Arikara Nation. Jackson completed his primary education at St. Joseph's Indian School near Chamberlain, South Dakota, and completed his secondary education at Intermountain Indian School in Brigham City, Utah. He went on to earn a Bachelor of Science in education from Northeastern Oklahoma State University and a Master of Fine Arts in photography from the San Francisco Art Institute.

== Career ==
Jackson's photographic series include "Indian Photographing Tourist Photographing Indian", "Native American Veterans", "Indian Man in San Francisco", and "Entering Zig's Indian Reservation". Many of his works feature an ironic or humorous perspective on contemporary Native American issues. In "Indian Photographing Tourist Photographing Indian", Jackson "satirizes white tourists becoming anthropological subjects as they photograph Native American powwow dancers." Many of the tourists are so focused on the dancers they are unaware of Jackson's presence.

"Entering Zig's Indian Reservation", which Artsy describes as "perhaps his best-known series", features Jackson in various urban environments wearing a traditional headdress, staking claim to them with an official-looking reservation sign. On behalf of American Indian Quarterly, Kate Morris highlighted how, with this work, "Jackson establishes his own boundaries, reclaims Indian territories, and writes, rather than is subject to, the rule of law."

In 2005, Jackson became the first Native American photographer to be represented in the collections of the Library of Congress. Jackson was awarded a Guggenheim Fellowship in 2021, becoming the first indigenous American photographer to receive the award.
