= Brigham City Utah Temple =

Temple of The Church of Jesus Christ of Latter-day Saints

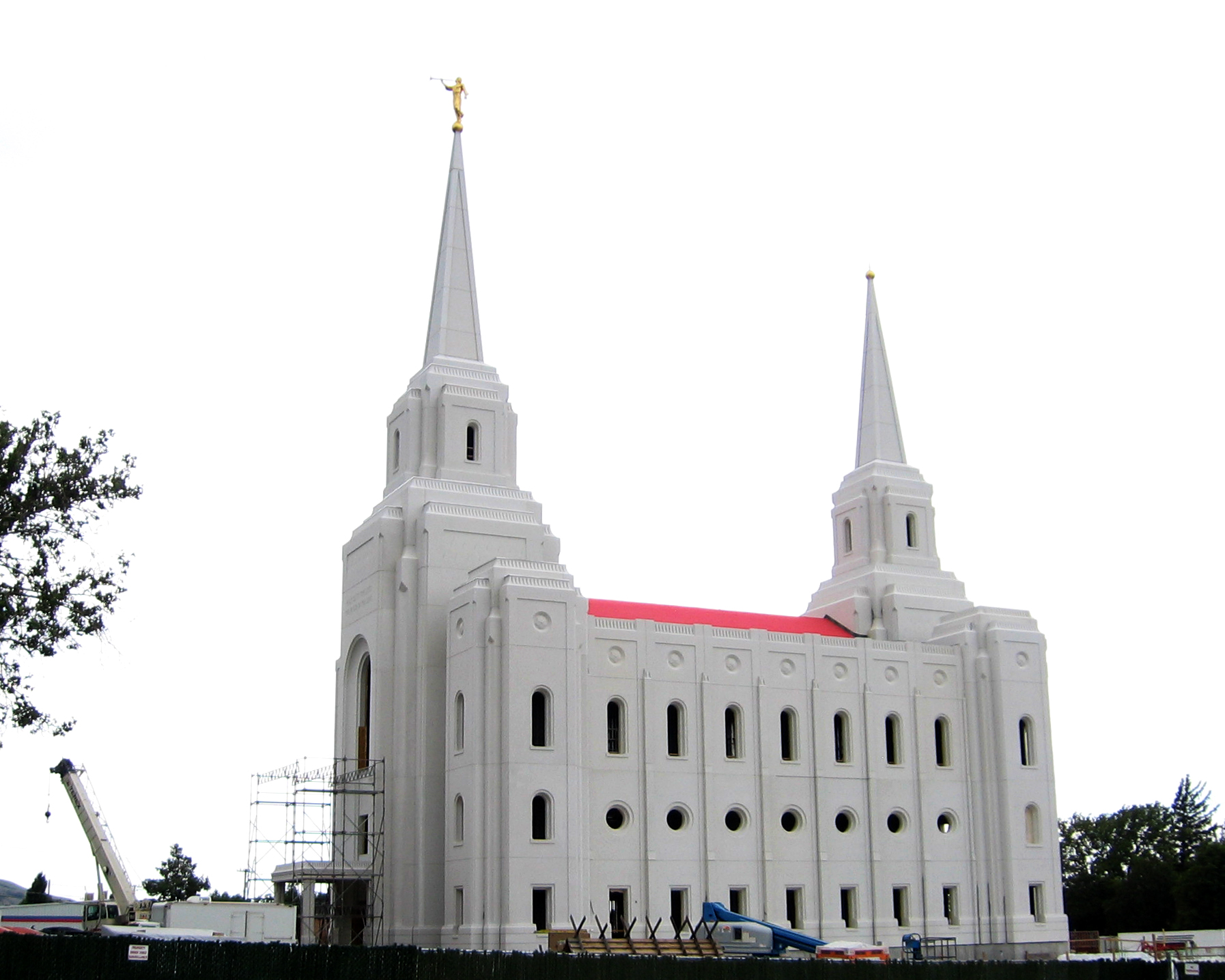
- Interactive map of Brigham City Utah Temple
- Number: 139
- Dedication: September 23, 2012, by Boyd K. Packer
- Site: 3.14 acres (1.27 ha)
- Floor area: 36,000 ft^{2} (3,300 m^{2})
- Height: 165 ft (50 m)
- Official website • News & images

Church chronology
← Manaus Brazil Temple	Brigham City Utah Temple	→ Calgary Alberta Temple

Additional information
- Announced: October 3, 2009, by Thomas S. Monson
- Groundbreaking: July 31, 2010, by Boyd K. Packer
- Open house: August 18-September 15, 2012
- Current president: Robert Ellis Steed
- Location: Brigham City, Utah, United States
- Coordinates: 41°30′19.48″N 112°0′59.65″W
- Exterior finish: Precast concrete
- Baptistries: 1
- Ordinance rooms: 2 (two-stage progressive)
- Sealing rooms: 3

The Brigham City Utah Temple is a temple of the Church of Jesus Christ of Latter-day Saints (LDS Church) in Brigham City, Utah. The intent to build the temple was announced on October 3, 2009, by church president Thomas S. Monson, during general conference. It is the fourteenth temple of the LDS Church completed in Utah.

The temple has two attached end spires. The temple was designed by FFKR Architects, using a design inspired by pioneer-era temples. A groundbreaking ceremony, signifying the beginning of construction, was held on 31 July 2010, conducted by Boyd K. Packer, president of the Quorum of the Twelve Apostles, and a native of Brigham City.

== History ==
The temple was announced by church president Thomas S. Monson on 3 October 2009, during general conference. It was announced concurrently with the Concepción Chile, Fort Lauderdale Florida, Fortaleza Brazil and Sapporo Japan temples. At the time, the announcement brought the total number of LDS temples worldwide to 151 (including those under construction and announced).

The temple is located on the property where the Central Elementary School once stood at 250 South Main Street in Brigham City, across from the historic tabernacle.

On the morning of 28 June 2011, the western spire was installed. The angel Moroni statue was installed on the eastern tower on 12 July 2011. The installation was delayed for almost two hours due to weather problems.

After construction was completed, a public open house was held on weekdays from 18 August through 15 September 2012. The temple was dedicated in three sessions on 23 September 2012 by Packer. The dedicatory sessions were broadcast to the church's congregations in Utah. In connection with the dedication, a cultural celebration featuring music and dance was held the night before.

== Design and architecture ==
The building has a traditional Latter-day Saint temple design, inspired by pioneer-era temples like the Salt Lake and Manti Utah temples. Designed by FFKR Architects, the temple's architecture reflects both the cultural heritage of the Brigham City region and its spiritual significance to the church.

The temple is on a 3.1-acre plot, with surrounding landscaping including 26 fruit trees.

The structure stands two stories tall, and is constructed with precast concrete. The exterior has “a highly complex and personalized facade full of detailed accents and step backs and topped by 50-foot tall precast steeples atop towers at each end.”

The interior features “stone flooring, hand carved rock, maple wood trim, several pieces of original artwork and 12 unique cast bronze oxen in the baptistry.” A peach blossom motif can be seen throughout the temple, and is especially prominent in the second floor art-glass windows. The temple includes two instruction rooms, three sealing rooms, and one baptistry, each designed for ceremonial use.

The design has elements representing Latter-day Saint symbolism and the history of the area, to provide deeper spiritual meaning to its appearance and function. Symbolism is important to church members and include the peach blossom motif, reflecting the region’s agricultural history, and the twelve oxen supporting the baptismal font, which represent the twelve tribes of Israel.

== Temple presidents ==
The church's temples are directed by a temple president and matron, each serving for a term of three years. The president and matron oversee the administration of temple operations and provide guidance and training for both temple patrons and staff.

Serving from 2012 to 2015, the first president of the Brigham City Utah Temple was Preston J. Checketts, with Louise B. Checketts serving as matron. As of 2024, Michael J. Hess is the president, with Danece D. Hess being the matron.

== Admittance ==
On 19 April 2012, the church announced the public open house that was held from 18 August to 15 September 2012.

Like all the LDS church's temples, it is not used for Sunday worship services. To members of the church, temples are regarded as sacred houses of the Lord. Once dedicated, only church members with a current temple recommend can enter for worship.

== See also ==
Temples in Utah
Wasatch Front Temples
Temples along the Wasatch Front
- = Operating
- = Under construction
- = Announced
- = Temporarily Closed

- The Church of Jesus Christ of Latter-day Saints in Utah
- Comparison of temples of The Church of Jesus Christ of Latter-day Saints
- List of temples of The Church of Jesus Christ of Latter-day Saints
- List of temples of The Church of Jesus Christ of Latter-day Saints by geographic region
- Temple architecture (Latter-day Saints)
