= Scott Sandall =

Member of the Utah House of Representatives

Member of the Utah State Senate
- Incumbent
- Assumed office January 1, 2019
- Preceded by: Peter C. Knudson
- Constituency: 17th district (2019–2023); 1st district (2023–present)

Member of the Utah House of Representatives from the 1st district
- In office January 1, 2015 – December 31, 2018
- Preceded by: Ronda Rudd Menlove
- Succeeded by: Joel Ferry

Personal details
- Party: Republican
- Spouse: Christie
- Education: Brigham Young University
- Profession: Farmer/Rancher
- Website: Official website

Scott D. Sandall is an American politician and a Republican member of the Utah State Senate representing District 1. He previously represented District 17 from 2019 to 2023 prior to redistricting.

== Early life and career ==
Sandall earned his BS degree in Agricultural Economics from Brigham Young University in 1985 and currently works as a farmer and rancher. He lives in Tremonton, Utah with his wife Christie.

== Political career ==
In 2014, Sandall ran as a Republican for the open seat in District 17, vacated by incumbent Ronda Menlove, who chose not to seek re-election. He faced Dorene Schulze-Stever from the Democratic Party and Lee H. Phipps from the Constitution Party in the general election. Sandall won the general election with 5,592 votes (77.3%) to Schulze-Stever's 1,035 votes (14.31%) and Phipps's 607 votes (8.39%).

During the 2016 legislative session, Sandall served on the Infrastructure and General Government Appropriations Subcommittee, the House Natural Resources, Agriculture and Environment Committee, and the House Economic Development and Workforce Services Committee.

== 2016 sponsored legislation ==
Bill number	Bill title	Status
HB0031	Enterprise Zone Amendments	Governor Signed - 3/1/2016
HB0112S01	Continuing Education for Contractor Licensing Amendments	Governor Signed - 3/25/2016
HB0213	Agricultural Modifications	Governor Signed - 3/17/2016
HCR013	Concurrent Resolution Urging Congress to Support the Implementation of Utah's Sage-Grouse Conservation Plan	House/ filed - 3/10/2016

Sandall passed three of the four bills he introduced during the 2016 General Session, giving him a 75% passage rate. He also floor sponsored SB0075 Water Rights Adjudication Amendments and SB0200S01 Compensatory Mitigation Program for Sage Grouse.

== Election results ==
2022 Utah State Senat,e District 1 General Election
Party	Candidate	Votes	%
Republican	Scott Sandall	32,597	100
Total votes		32,597	100

2018 Utah Senate, District 17 General Election
Party	Candidate	Votes	%
Republican	Scott Sandall	28,471	77.8
Democratic	Michael Keil	8,110	22.2
Total votes		36,581	100

2016 Utah State House of Representatives, District 1 General Election
Party	Candidate	Votes	%
Republican	Scott Sandall	11,268	82.85
Constitution	Sherry Phipps	2,333	17.15
Total votes		13,601	100

2014 Utah House of Representatives, District 1 General Election
Party	Candidate	Votes	%
Republican	Scott Sandall	5,592	77.3
Democratic	Dorene Schulze-Stever	1,035	14.3
Constitution	Lee H. Philipps	607	8.4
Total votes		7,234	100
