= Joel Ferry =

American politician and rancher

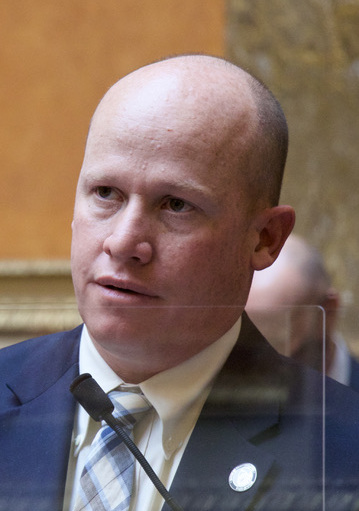

Executive Director of the Utah Department of Natural Resources
- Incumbent
- Assumed office September 2022
- Nominated by: Spencer Cox

Member of the Utah House of Representatives from the 1st district
- In office January 1, 2023 – January 2023
- Preceded by: Thomas Peterson
- Succeeded by: Thomas Peterson
- In office January 1, 2019 – August 26, 2022
- Preceded by: Scott Sandall
- Succeeded by: Thomas Peterson

Personal details
- Party: Republican
- Spouse: Becca
- Children: 5
- Education: Utah State University (BS)

Joel Ferry is an American politician and rancher who served as a member of the Utah House of Representatives from the 1st district. Elected in 2018, he assumed office on January 2, 2019.

== Early life and education ==
Ferry is a native of Box Elder County, Utah and graduated from Box Elder High School in 1996. He earned a Bachelor of Science degree in economics and finance from Utah State University.

== Career ==
After graduating from college, Ferry worked as a banker at Zions Bancorporation in Salt Lake City. Ferry later returned to Corinne, Utah to work on his family's farm with his father and uncle. Ferry has also served as the chairman of the Box Elder County Republican Party. In 2018, he was elected to the Utah House of Representatives, assuming office on January 2, 2019, and succeeding Scott Sandall. Ferry appeared at the signing ceremony of the 2018 United States farm bill. He has expressed concern about the potential for the Great Salt Lake to dry up, comparing the effect to "a potential environmental nuclear bomb".

In July 2022, Governor Spencer Cox nominated Ferry to serve as Utah Department of Natural Resources. The position requires confirmation by the Utah State Senate. He resigned in August and was replaced by Thomas Peterson but remained on the November 2022 ballot and was re-elected. He resigned again in January 2023 and was again replaced with Peterson.

== Personal life ==
Ferry and his wife, Becca, have five children. His uncle, Ben Ferry, also served in the Utah House of Representatives.
