= Larry Elsner =

American sculptor and academic

Larry Elsner (1930-1990) was an art professor, sculptor, and sketchbook artist who taught at Utah State University for thirty years. Known throughout the world for his art, he lived most of his life in Logan, Utah with his wife Yoko Yamakawa until his death on March 27, 1990.

== Early life ==
Elsner was born in Gooding, Idaho in 1930 and was raised on his family's ranch. This environment had a profound effect on him, and he would bring these influences with him to his work. In 1948 he enrolled in the University of Idaho and graduated in 1951. Two years later, he joined the United States Navy. In 1955, he left the Navy and attended Utah State University, from which he graduated with a Bachelor's in Fine Arts in 1957. He then went to Columbia University where he studied under Oronzio Maldarelli, earning a Master's degree in 1958. In addition to these degrees, Elsner also studied metalsmithing at the Cranbrook Academy of Art and sculpture and pottery at the Archie Bray Foundation.

== Professorship and professional artwork ==
In 1960, Elsner joined the faculty at Utah State, teaching anatomy, drawing, ceramics, metalsmithing, jewelry casting and sculpture. During this time, he worked on art projects of his own in bronze, stone, plaster, clay, metal and wood. He would often use his own work as a model for his students. As a product of his creative process, Elsner created hundreds detailed and precise sketched studies, some of which became artworks in and of themselves. These sketchbooks are currently stored in the Special Collections and Archives department of the Merrill-Cazier Library at Utah State University. A digital collection of many of these drawings can be found here in an exhibit in USU's Digital History Collections.

== Interracial marriage and its effects ==
=== In America ===
Logan, Utah was not unlike the rest of the states during the time of the Civil Rights Movement. As a result, the marriage of Elsner and Yoko Yamakawa was not well-accepted by the local community. Some of Elsner's former friends would not speak to him because of his decisions, and although his wife was a skilled microbiologist, she was not able to get a professorship at the University. Her highest level of work was that of a research supervisor.

=== In Japan ===
Upon Elsner's first visit with his wife to Japan, he was welcomed warmly and treated very well. The Japanese people, especially in Tokyo, loved his sculptures, particularly because they were unglazed. His previous research in Chinese art forms and history had opened the door to more research into Asian art and Asian studies in general. These factors combined with his skill in sculpture and other art forms gave him the leverage he needed to open four one-man exhibits in Tokyo, each of them receiving critical approval. His visits to Japan led to an oriental influence on his art which was valued both in Japan and in America.

== Awards ==
In 1962, Elsner won the Ford Foundation Purchase Award. He also won three merit awards at the Utah Designer Craftsman Show.
