= Brigham City Museum of Art & History =

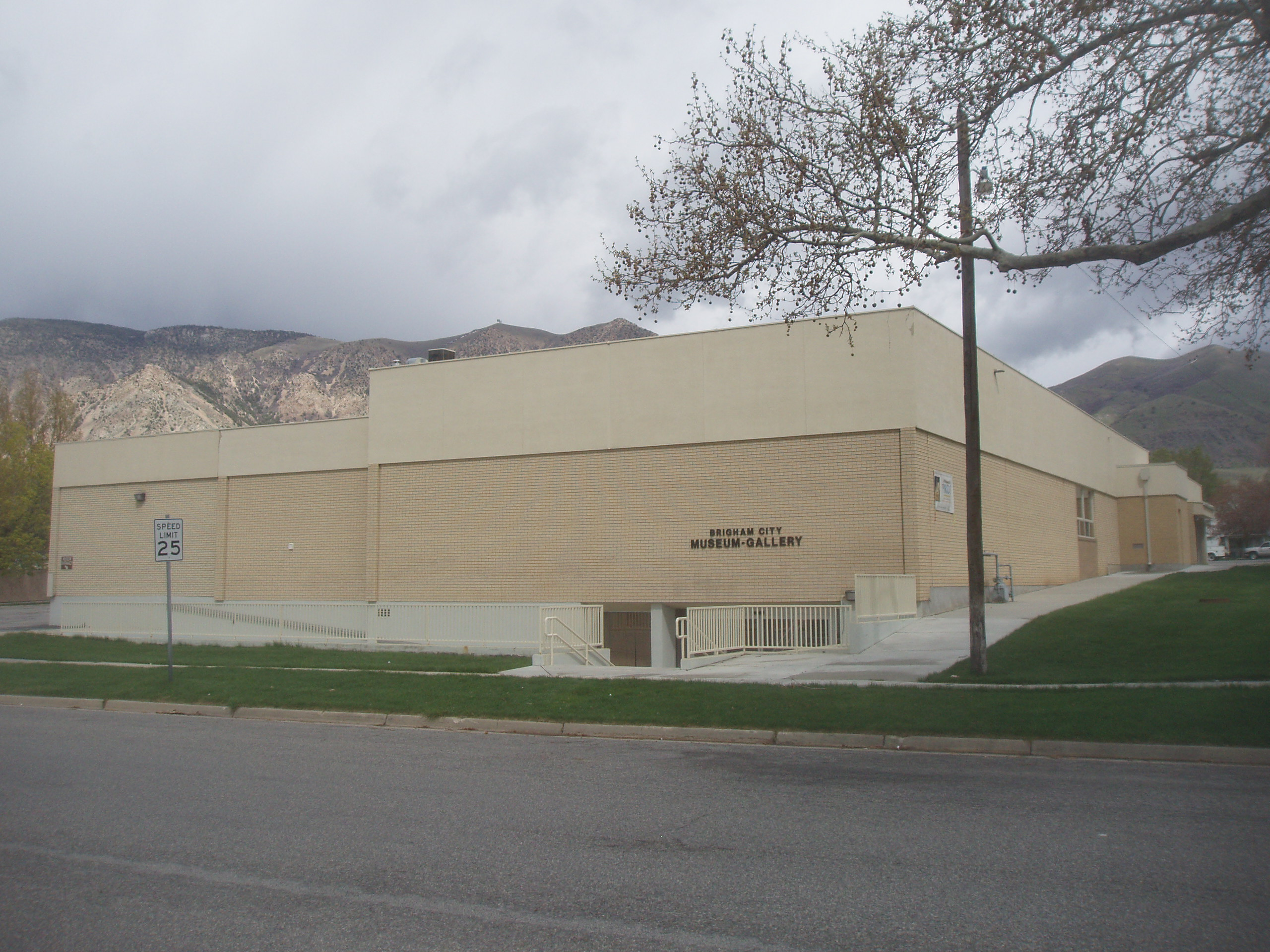
- Entrance to the museum
- Established: 1970
- Location: Brigham City, Box Elder County, Utah
- Coordinates: 41°30′40″N 112°01′14″W
- Type: Art Museum, History Museum
- Director: Alana Blumenthal
- Public transit access: 300 W. @ 24 N.
- Website: www.brighamcitymuseum.org

The Brigham City Museum of Art & History, also known as the BCMG or, formerly, the Brigham City Museum-Gallery, is an art museum and history museum in Brigham City, Utah. The museum is a department of Brigham City Corporation (i.e., the City), but also has a non-profit foundation, the Box Elder Museum Foundation, Inc.

== History ==
The museum opened in 1970, in the Brigham City Community Center building. The building was planned to be a community center, but plans were underway to include a museum in the basement portion of the museum before it opened. In 1969 a precursor to the museum was briefly open on Main Street, celebrating the centennial of the completion of the transcontinental railroad.

In the early years, exhibitions changed monthly and included a wide variety of exhibitions, generally drawn from personal collections of board members or friends of the museum. Exhibition areas included art, history, and natural history.

In 2009, a satellite museum, the Box Elder Museum of Natural History, opened in the King building, and moved to the Hervin Bunderson Center in 2010.

In 2014, the museum won the American Association for State and Local History Leadership in History Award of Merit for the project Outside the Homeland: The Intermountain Indian School. The project included a 2012 exhibition of the same name, an online version of the exhibition, oral histories with former students of the school, and public programs on the school.

== Collections ==
The museum's permanent collections include artifacts, photographs, and documents related to the pioneer settlement of Brigham City and Shoshone occupations in the area (including that of the Washakie), as well as historical items from throughout Box Elder County from settlement to the present. The museum also has a collection of fine art, including works by a variety of Utah artists. Some of the collections have been digitized and are available online.

== Special exhibits ==
The museum hosts a variety of temporary exhibits, each lasting 4–12 weeks. These include temporary exhibits curated by the museum's staff, as well as traveling exhibits sourced through other museums or organizations (such as NEH on the Road or SITES). Previous exhibits have included displays of works by various Utah artists, including Minerva Teichert, Jim Stettler, and others, as well as Earth From Space (via SITES). Each summer, the museum curates a quilt exhibit with quilts from throughout the world, with featured quilters from all over.

== Programs ==
Programs have varied over the years, but include a historic home tour, special tours for schools, scout groups, etc.,

== See also ==
- Mormon art
