= Box Elder High School =

Location
- 380 S. 600 W. Brigham City, Utah; United States; 41°30′12″N 112°01′35″W

Information
- Type: Public high school
- Established: 1894
- School district: Box Elder School District
- NCES School ID: 490009000046
- Principal: Robbie Gunter
- Faculty: 66.34 (FTE)
- Grades: 10-12
- Enrollment: 1,603 (2023-2024)
- Student to teacher ratio: 24.16
- Colors: Purple and white
- Athletics: UHSAA
- Athletics conference: Class 5A Region V
- Mascot: Beesley the Bee
- Yearbook: Buzzer
- Website: www.behs.besd.net

Box Elder High School (BEHS) is a public high school located in Brigham City, Utah. Part of the Box Elder School District, it serves approximately 1,500 students in the 10th through 12th grades in Utah's Box Elder County. The school's boundaries stretch from Willard in the south, over to Corinne in the west, Honeyville in the north, and Mantua in the east. The school mascot is the Bee.

== History ==
Box Elder High School was built in 1894 at 18 S. 500 E. Brigham City, Utah. Since then, Box Elder Middle School has taken over that building. Over time there have been several additions and modifications to the school building. It moved to its present location, 380 S. 600 W., in 1961. The most recent renovation was started in 2007 and was finished and dedicated in 2010.

== Extracurricular activities ==
=== Athletics ===
The Bees are in Utah's 5A classification in all sports, and compete in Region 5. Box Elder High currently holds eight state titles in football, eight in wrestling, eight in men's track, and six in women's softball. Sports played at BEHS include:

- Baseball (boys')
- Basketball (boys' & girls')
- Cross country (boys' & girls')
- Drill Team (girls)
- Football (boys')
- Golf (boys' & girls')
- Lacrosse (boys' & girls')
- Soccer (boys' & girls')
- Softball (girls')
- Tennis (boys' & girls')
- Track & Field (boys' & girls')
- Swimming (boys' & girls')
- Volleyball (girls')
- Wrestling (boys')

Football. The Bees have won the 4A state championship in football three times, with the last victory coming in 1995.

Track & Field. The boys' team won the 4A state championship in 1992 and 1999. The girls' team won the 4A state championship in 2017.

Wrestling. Each year the Richardson Memorial Invitational tournament is held at BEHS. Coach Craner has noted that "A lot of teams use the Richardson as a guide for the state tournament." Box Elder won the 4A state championships in 1989, 1995, 1996, 1999, 2000, 2001, 2005, and 2011. Box Elder wrestling was ranked 18th in the nation in 2011, completed an undefeated season, and broke the state record for most points scored in a state tournament (312 points).

Softball. Since women's softball began being played in Utah in 1990, Box Elder has won more games than any other team in the state. Coach Jim Fuller retired in 2010 as "the winningest high school softball coach in Utah, with a 423-114 career won loss record (a .788 winning percentage) and six state championships (his final was at Fremont High School)". The team won its first 4A state title in 1995 against its biggest rival, Bear River, and then followed that title with state crowns in 1996, 1997, 1999 and 2001. They were nationally ranked by USA Today in 1996 and 1997. Since 1990 they also have four second-place state showings and three third place finishes, playing in 9 of 21 state championship softball games. BEHS softball has won 11 league titles, and has had 50 players receive either NCAA Division I or NJCAA scholarships.

The Rockettes. The BEHS drill team won the 4A division state drill team championships in the 2002 & 2006. It tied for 1st in the 4A novelty category in 1996, and 5th place in the dance category in 2008.

Swimming. The BEHS swim team has won 33 region champions

Girls Region Titles: 1985, 1986, 1987, 1988, 1989, 2000, 2001, 2019, 2020, 2021, 2022, 2023, 2024, 2025, 2026

Boys Region Titles: 1988, 1989, 1992, 1996, 1997, 2002, 2014, 2016, 2017, 2018, 2019, 2020, 2021, 2022, 2023, 2024, 2025, 2026

==== Rivalries ====
Box Elder High School has a rivalry with Bear River High School in nearby Garland. These schools, both located in the same school district, also overlap boundaries in the towns of Honeyville, and Bear River City, making the rivalry much more fierce among students from those towns. Competition and tensions often run to extreme levels in invitational games, meets, and matches.

=== Orchestra program ===
The orchestra performs one concert each trimester, with the addition of the Box Elder School District Foundation concert, where they combine with the orchestra from nearby Bear River High School and play with a guest conductor each February, with the purpose of building partnerships and relationships between schools and communities. The Orchestra class consists of roughly 40–50 students. No tryout is needed to participate in the orchestra, although some experience is suggested. The orchestra qualified for state in 2007 and 2014.

=== Choral program ===
Box Elder High School choirs have received Superior ratings at Region and State Festivals and have won awards at the State UMEA Convention, Division ACDA Convention, and the Heritage San Francisco Festival (2002). BEHS Madrigals perform throughout Northern Utah, and have received Superior ratings at state competitions. They were named "Outstanding Choral Group" and "Outstanding Choral Program" at Vancouver, British Columbia, Canada and the 1997 Houston, Texas Festival.

The choir programs are Men's Chorus, Women's Chorus, Mixed Chorus, Arioso Choir, Concert Choir and Madrigals. Students must complete a tryout if they want to be in Arioso, Concert Choir or Madrigals.

== Notable alumni ==
- Marc Dunn, former NFL and NFL Europe player
- Joel Ferry, rancher, farmer, and member of the Utah House of Representatives
- Dantzel White Nelson (1926–2004), first wife of Russell M. Nelson
- Boyd K. Packer, member of the Quorum of the Twelve Apostles of the Church of Jesus Christ of Latter-day Saints
- Elmer Ward, NFL player
