= Stephen M. Studdert =

American political advisor

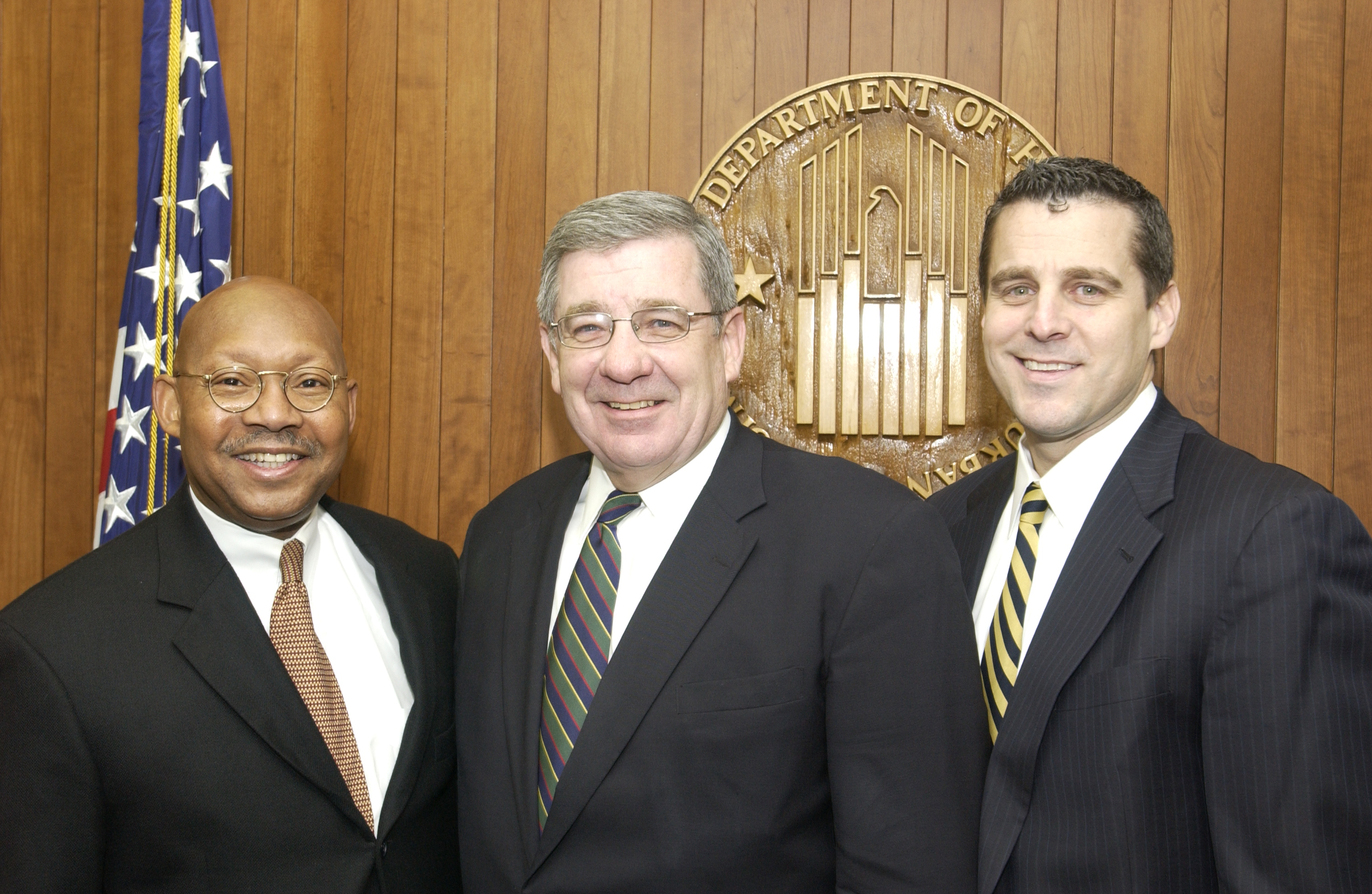
Stephen Studdert (center) with Alphonso Jackson in 2008

Stephen Mark Studdert (born 1948) is a geopolitical strategist and international problem solver. He served on the White House staff as Advisor to United States presidents George H. W. Bush, Ronald Reagan, and Gerald Ford and had special assignments in the Clinton, George W Bush, and Trump administrations.

== Early life ==
Studdert was born in 1948 in Petaluma, California, to Harry and June Graham. He earned a bachelor's degree in public administration at Brigham Young University in 1971.

== Career ==
From 1973 to 1975, Studdert was chief of the Brigham City, Utah police department. He served as a Bountiful City Council member from 1978 to 1980, and as the 1975 United States Junior Chamber President.

Studdert has represented U.S. Presidents in diplomatic assignments to over one hundred nations. Between 1983 and 1987 he served on the President's Export Council, the Export Advisory Now Council and the Foreign Trade Practices and Negotiations Subcommittee. He was a United States Delegate to the United Nations Energy Conference in Africa and to the 40th anniversary NATO Summit. He has been extensively involved in post-conflict reconstruction efforts in Iraq and Kurdistan since 2005. Since 2016, he has served as a senior advisor to the World Energy Forum.

As a strong advocate of affordable housing, Studdert headed the national Native American Housing Initiative from 1985 to 1995. He chaired the Housing and Community Development efforts of a $44 billion Federal Home Loan Bank, where he served on the Board of Directors as its Chairman. He was elected by his peers to chair the Federal Home Loan Bank System Council of Chairs.

He directed the 1989 Presidential inauguration of Bush, having previously served as an advisor to the 1981 and 1985 inaugurations of Reagan. He provided counsel to the 2001 and 2005 inaugurations of George W. Bush. In 1992, during the Clinton Administration, he was appointed a Federal Home Loan Banks Director in Seattle. Studdert remains active in international religious liberty issues.

Studdert was national Co-Chair of the New American Revolution, a foundation for helping youth in need, between 1992 and 1993. He served as chair of the Utah Statehood Centennial Commission between 1993 and 1996 and Chair of This is the Place Foundation between 1996 and 2001.

Studdert helped create the Fortune 500 Forum for senior executives and has participated in the 1999 TIME magazine’s leaders’ world news-tour. From, 2004 until 2010, he served on the Executive Committee of Boy Scouts of America's Utah National Parks Council. He served as Chairman of the George Washington Center for Freedom and Understanding from 2005 till 2008. He also served on the Board of Trustees of Southern Virginia University from which he was awarded an Honorary Doctorate of Public Service.

Studdert is author of America in Danger (2007).

== Personal life ==
Studdert and his wife, Bonnie Beck, are the parents of six children. He is member of the Church of Jesus Christ of Latter-day Saints and served in the church as a mission president from 2001 to 2004.

== Awards and decorations ==
He was awarded the Distinguished Citizen Award from the Boy Scouts of America, the National Guard Minuteman Award, the People of Vision award, the Farm Bureau’s Friend of Agriculture Award, and the citizen Distinguished Service Medal from the United States Army.

He was awarded an honorary doctorate by SVU.
