= Lee Frischknecht =

American journalist (1928–2004)

- Born: January 4, 1928
- Died: December 29, 2004 (aged 76)
- Citizenship: American
- Education: Utah State University, Michigan State University
- Occupation: President of National Public Radio
- Years active: 1973–1977
- Spouse: Sara Jean McCulloch (m. 1950–2004)
- Children: 4 daughters

Lee Conrad Frischknecht (January 4, 1928 – December 29, 2004) was a broadcast journalist and, from 1973 to 1977, was the second president of National Public Radio.

== Biography ==
Frischknecht was born in Brigham City, Utah to Carl and Geniel Frischknecht (née Lund), and after graduation from Logan High School, spent two years (1946–1948) in the army in Japan. He graduated from Utah State University (USU) in 1951 with a degree in speech and radio. He earned a master's degree in Radio-TV from Michigan State University in 1957.

== Career ==
After graduation, Frischknecht initially worked in Idaho and after earning a graduate degree in Michigan, later moved to New York City to work at PBS affiliate WNET. As president he saw a shift from predominantly news coverage to more human interest reporting.

Frischknecht returned to USU to work for a time and then moved to Washington, DC to work at National Public Radio under its first president, Don Quayle. He joined the fledgling public radio enterprise as director of network affairs and later as vice president. Frischknecht became president of NPR in 1973, and served in that capacity until 1977. He returned to television at Arizona State University's KAET in 1980 and later helped found KBAQ. He retired in 1993.

== Personal ==
Frischknecht was married for 54 years (until his death) to the former Sara Jean McCulloch and had four daughters. He was a lifelong member of the Church of Jesus Christ of Latter-day Saints.
