= List of speakers of the Utah House of Representatives =

Speaker of Utah House of Representatives
- Incumbent; Mike Schultz since November 15, 2023
- Status: Presiding officer
- Seat: Utah State Capitol, Salt Lake City
- Appointer: Utah House of Representatives
- Inaugural holder: Presley Denny

The following is a list of speakers of the Utah House of Representatives since statehood.

== Speakers of the Utah House of Representatives ==
Speaker	Term	Party	County/Residence	Notes	Citation
Presley Denny	1896–1897		Beaver County		
John M. Perkins	1897–1899		Weber County		
William M. Roylance	1899–1901	Democratic	Utah County		
William Glasmann	1901–1903	Republican	Weber County		
Thomas Hull	1903–1907		Salt Lake County		
Harry Joseph	1907–1909		Salt Lake County		
Edward Robinson	1909–1913		Cache County		
William J. Seely	1913–1915	Republican	Emery County		
Lewis R. Anderson	1915–1917	Republican	Sanpete County		
John F. Tolton	1917–1919	Democratic	Beaver County		
Charles C. Richards	1919–1921	Democratic	Salt Lake County		
Edward R. Callister	1921–1923	Republican	Salt Lake County		
William W. Seegmiller	1923–1925	Republican	Kane County		
William E. McKell	1925–1927	Republican	Salt Lake County		
Samuel M. Jorgensen	1927–1929	Republican	Sevier County		
David Lowe Stine	1929–1931	Republican	Weber County		
James C. Hacking	1931–1933	Republican	Uintah County		
Isaac A. Smoot	1933–1935	Democratic	Salt Lake County		
Walter K. Granger	1935–1937	Democratic	Iron County		
Joseph W. Jensen	1937–1939	Democratic	Weber County		
Heber Bennion Jr.	1939–1941	Democratic	Daggett County		
Sheldon R. Brewster	1941–1943	Democratic	Salt Lake County		
William Rulon White	1943–1947	Democratic	Weber County		
Rendell Mabey	1947–1949	Republican	Salt Lake County		
Ed J. McPolin	1949–1951	Democratic	Summit County		
Clifton Kerr	1951–1953	Republican	Box Elder County		
Merrill K. Davis	1953–1955	Republican	Salt Lake County		
Charles Eric Peterson	1955–1957	Republican	Utah County		
Jaren L. Jones	1957–1959	Republican	Salt Lake County		
Sheldon R. Brewster	1959–1961	Democratic	Salt Lake County		
Ernest H. Dean	1961–1963	Democratic	Utah County		
Charles Welch Jr.	1963–1965	Republican	Salt Lake County		
Kay C. Allen	1965–1967	Democratic	Salt Lake County		
Franklin W. Gunnell	1967–1969	Republican	Cache County		
Lorin N. Pace	1969–1971	Republican	Salt Lake County		
Richard C. Howe	1971–1973	Democratic	Salt Lake County		
Howard C. Nielson	1973–1975	Republican	Utah County		
Ronald L. Rencher	1975–1977	Democratic	Weber County		
Glade M. Sowards	1977–1979	Republican	Uintah County		
James V. Hansen	1979–1981	Republican	Davis County		
Norman H. Bangerter	1981–1985	Republican	Salt Lake County		
Robert H. Garff	1985–1987	Republican	Davis County		
Glen E. Brown	1987–1989	Republican	Summit County		
Nolan E. Karras	1989–1991	Republican	Weber County		
Craig Moody	1991–1993	Republican	Salt Lake County		
Rob Bishop	1992–1994	Republican	Box Elder County		
Melvin R. Brown	1994–1998	Republican	Summit County		
Martin Stephens	1998–2005	Republican	Salt Lake County		
Greg Curtis	2005–2009	Republican	Salt Lake County		
David Clark	2008–2011	Republican	Washington County		
Rebecca D. Lockhart	2011–2015	Republican	Utah County		
Greg Hughes	2015–2018	Republican	Salt Lake County		
Brad Wilson	2019–2023	Republican	Davis County		
Mike Schultz	2023–	Republican	Weber County		

== Speakers of the Utah Territorial House of Representatives ==
Speaker	Term	Party	County/Residence	Notes	Citation
William Wines Phelps	1851–1852		Great Salt Lake		
Jedediah M. Grant	1852–1854		Great Salt Lake		
Hosea Stout	1856–1857		Great Salt Lake		
John Taylor	1857–1862		Great Salt Lake		
Orson Pratt	1862–1863		Salt Lake		
John Taylor	1863–1868		Great Salt Lake		
Orson Pratt	1869–1880		Salt Lake		
Francis M. Lyman	1881–1882		Tooele		
James Sharp	1884–1886		Salt Lake		
William W. Riter	1886–1890		Salt Lake		
James Sharp	1890–1892		Salt Lake		
William H. Seegmiller	1892–1894		Sevier		
Albion B. Emery	1894–1896		Park City		
