= Garff (surname) =

Garff is a surname. Notable people with the surname include:

- Enrico Garff (born 1939), Italian painter
- Joakim Garff (born 1960), Danish theologian
- Ken Garff (1906–1997), American businessman
- Melissa Garff Ballard, born Melissa Garff, American politician and music educator
- Robert H. Garff (1942–2020), American businessman and politician
