= Car dealerships in the United States =

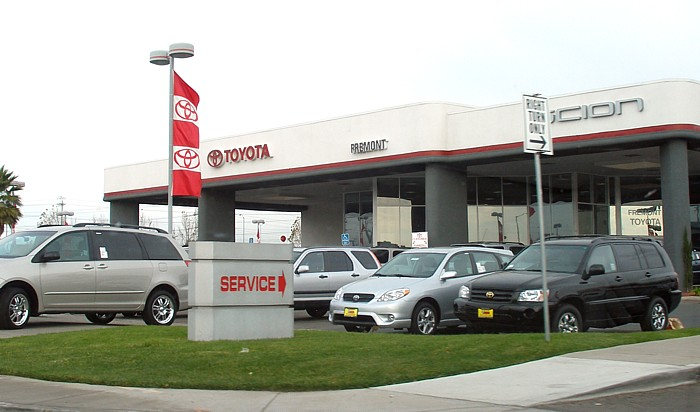
A typical franchised, new car and truck dealership in the United States

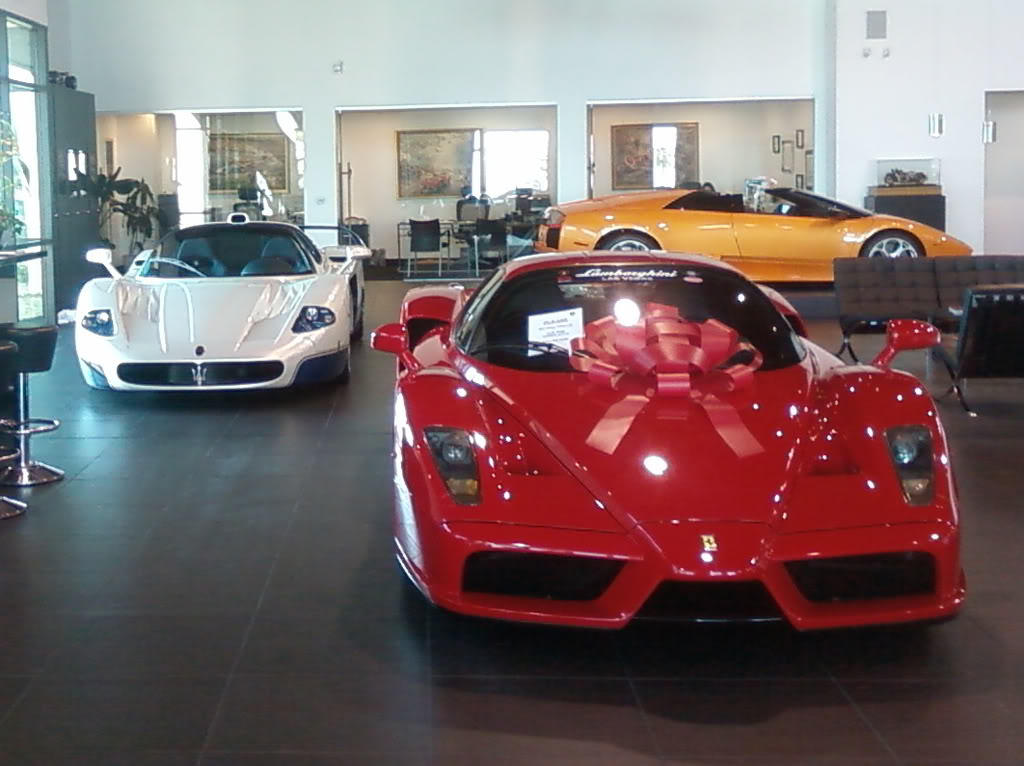
Car dealership showroom

In the United States, a car dealership is a business that sells cars. Dealerships are often either a franchised dealership that is affiliated with a specific manufacturer and primarily sells new cars, or an unaffiliated dealership that only sells used cars from various manufacturers. Most dealerships also provide maintenance and repair services as well as trade-in, leasing, and financing options for customers.

Some new car dealerships may carry multiple brands from the same manufacturer. In some locales, dealerships have been consolidated and a corporation may control a chain of dealerships representing several different manufacturers.

All 50 states have laws that prohibit auto manufacturers from competing with their franchised dealers by selling directly to consumers, with some states additionally prohibiting all direct auto sales. However, following efforts by Tesla in the 2010s, some states permit direct-to-consumer sales by manufacturers without franchise agreements. Economists have characterized these regulations as a form of rent-seeking that extracts rents from manufacturers of cars, increases costs for consumers, and limits entry of new car dealerships while raising profits for incumbent car dealers. Research shows that as a result of these laws, retail prices for cars are higher than they otherwise would be.

== Car sales ==
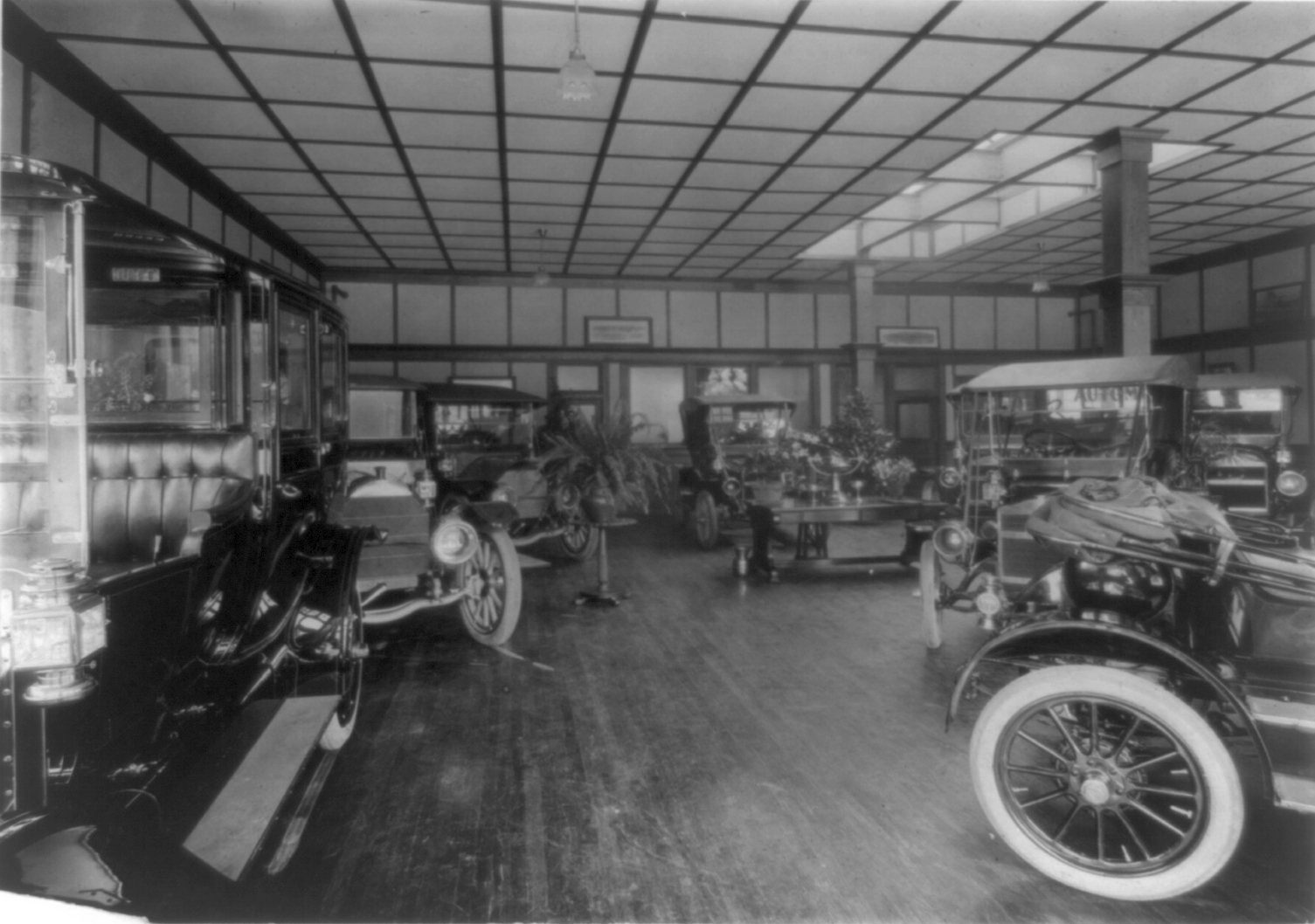
Sales floor of a Maxwell & Briscoe dealership (1911)

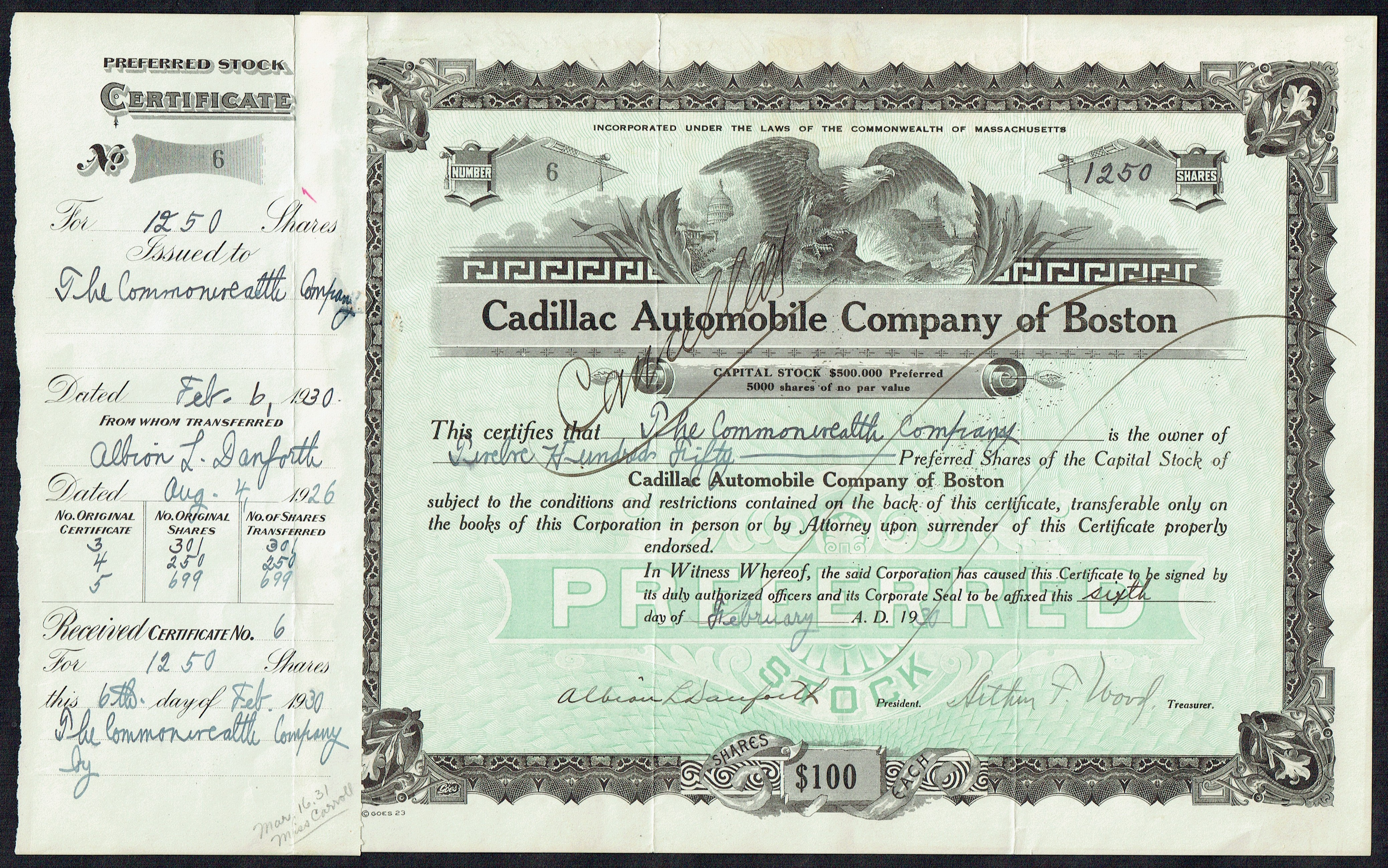
Share certificate of the car dealer 'Cadillac Automobile Company of Boston', issued 6 February 1930.

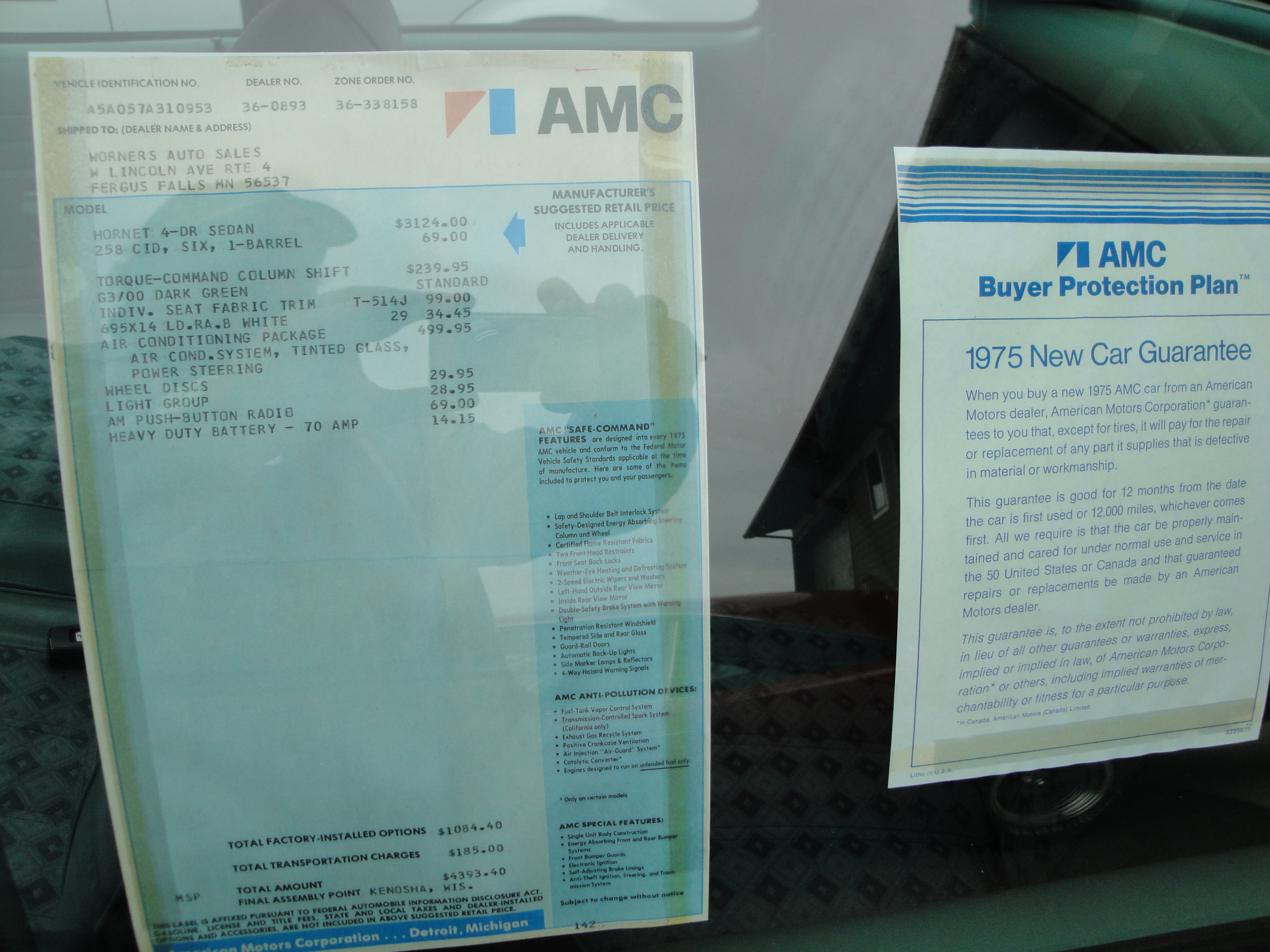
A Monroney sticker on window

Most car dealerships display their inventory in a showroom and on a car lot. Under U.S. federal law, all new cars must carry a sticker showing the offering price and summarizing the vehicle's features. Salespersons, predominantly those who only work on commission, negotiate with buyers to determine a final sales price. In many cases, this includes negotiating the price of a trade-in; the dealer's purchase of the buyer's current automobile. Negotiation from the dealership's perspective is the course of dealing that occurs beginning when a salesperson negotiates a deal to the point where the customer makes an offer on the new vehicle, often including the customer's current vehicle as part of the deal.

The salesperson then brings the offer, plus a sign of good faith from the customer, which can be a check with a deposit or a credit card, to the sales manager. This is also known as the booking amount, which is usually refundable. The sales manager returns options for the monthly payment, financing, and pricing options available to the customer in a process referred to as "desking" the deal. If the customer and sales manager agree on the terms, they sign off on the option chosen. The next step is a purchase and sales agreement or a sales agreement, and the actual monetary down payment is generated. The manager and customer sign this paperwork, and then the customer is handed off to the "box," or the finance and insurance office where various add-ons are often sold that include special waxing, wheel protection, or often, extended warranty services. The final paperwork is also printed out at this phase. A percentage of people believe that desking is part of the negotiation process, it only occurs once the salesperson has a legitimate offer on the vehicle from the customer and can hand the sales manager a token of good faith, as noted.

A car dealer orders vehicles from the manufacturer for inventory and pays interest (called flooring or floor planning). Dealer holdbacks are a system of payments made by manufacturers to their dealers. The holdback payments assist the dealer's ability to stock their inventory of vehicles and improve the profitability of dealers. Typically the holdback amount is around 1% to 3% of the vehicles' manufacturer's suggested retail price (MSRP). Hold-back is usually not a negotiable part of the price a consumer would pay for the vehicle, but dealers will give up the dealer holdback to get rid of a car that has been sitting in its inventory for a long time, or if the additional sale will bring them up to the manufacturer's additional incentive payments for reaching unit bonus targets. The holdback was originally designed to help offset the cost the new car dealer has for paying interest on the money that is borrowed to keep the car in inventory but is in effect lowering the dealer's gross profit, and thus the sales commissions paid to employees. The holdback allows dealerships to promote at- or near-invoice price sales and still achieve comfortable profits on such transactions.

With the advent of the Internet, the process of selling cars has undergone a considerable change. More than 70% of car purchases in the United States start with research on the Internet. It empowers buyers with knowledge of the features of comparable cars and the prices and discounts offered by different dealers within the same geographic area. This helps the buyers during price negotiations and puts further pressure on the profit margin of the dealer.

== Trading for cars ==
To an average dealer, the actual cash value of a trade is an opinion of what the vehicle could reasonably be sold for at auction in six weeks to three months, less any reconditioning costs should the dealer be unable or unwilling to re-sell the trade to the public. Since most states have requirements for a dealer to warranty or even guarantee a used vehicle for a certain amount of time and or mileage if sold to the public at a certain price, a dealer must make a profit selling the previously traded car (now a used car).

Trade-in value is an important facet of the car deal. Many websites offer trade-in value estimates. However, most of these values are estimated from a theoretical chart that may or may not be based on recent average sales prices of a particular make and model. If a particular make and model has less accurate data available from recent auction prices the dealer will be more cautious in the appraisal of the car.

A dealer may have a manager who appraises each vehicle offered for trade. This person will often be the person who also attends used car auctions, often buying and selling on behalf of the dealer. This person will have a realistic idea of the actual cash value of the trade. A dealer will look at a trade for body damage, windshield damage, engine noise, and known problems with a particular model, and price it to re-sell it at a profit.

== Additional services ==
Most car dealers offer a variety of financing options for the purchase of cars, including loans and leases. Financing can be highly profitable for dealerships. There have been some scandals involving discriminatory or predatory lending practices, and as a result, vehicle financing is heavily regulated in many states. For example, in California, there must be several signs prominently posted on the premises, and the contract must contain several prominent warnings, such as the words "THERE IS NO COOLING-OFF PERIOD".

Although the terms of installment contracts are negotiated by the dealer with the buyer, few dealers make loans directly to consumers. In the business, such dealers are called "Buy Here Pay Here" dealerships. These stores can make loans directly to customers because they have some means of recovering the vehicle if the customer defaults on the loan. The means by which "Buy Here Pay Here" dealers can recover a vehicle vary by state.

Most dealers utilize indirect lenders. This means that the installment loan contracts are immediately "assigned" or "resold" to third-party finance companies, often an offshoot of the car's manufacturer such as GM Financial, Ally Financial, or banks, which pay the dealer and then recover the balance by collecting the monthly installment payments promised by the buyer. To facilitate such assignments, dealers generally use one of several standard form contracts pre-approved by lenders. The most popular family of contracts for the retail installment sale of vehicles in the U.S. are sold by business process vendor Reynolds and Reynolds; their contracts have been the subject of extensive (and frequently hostile) judicial interpretation in lawsuits between dealers and customers.

The dealer has the option of marking up the interest rate of the contract and retaining a portion of that markup. For example, a bank may give a wholesale money rate of 6.75% and the dealer may give the consumer an interest rate of 7.75%. The bank would then pay the dealer the difference or a portion thereof. This is a regular practice because the dealership is selling the contract to a bank just like it sold a car to the customer. Most banks or states strictly limit the amount a contract rate may be marked up (by giving a range of rates at which they will buy the contract). In many cases, this amounts to little difference in the customer's payment as the amount borrowed is small by comparison to a mortgage and the term shorter.

Customers may also find that a dealer can get them better rates than they can with their local bank or credit union. However, manufacturers often offer a low-interest rate OR a cash rebate, if the vehicle is not financed through the dealer. Depending upon the amount of the rebate, it is prudent for the consumer to check if applying a larger rebate results in a lower payment due to the fact that s/he is financing less of the purchase. For example, if a dealer has an interest rate offer of 7.9% financing OR a $2000.00 rebate and a consumer's lending source offers 8.25%, a consumer should compare at the credit union what payments and total interest paid would be, if the consumer financed $2000.00 less at the credit union. The dealer can have their lending institution check a consumer's credit. A consumer can also allow his or her lending source to do the same and compare the results. Most financing available at new car dealerships is offered by the financing arm of the vehicle manufacturer or a local bank.

Dealers may also offer other services. These additional services can include:

- Service contracts: While any vehicle sold in the United States now comes standard with some degree of manufacturer's warranty coverage, customers have a wide range of choices to cover their vehicle from mechanical failure beyond that point. Service contracts may have the same terms of coverage as the vehicle's original manufacturer's warranty, but often they do not. Often service contracts carry a deductible as might any insurance contract. Because of the vast number of choices, it is important for consumers to be aware of the coverages before entering into an agreement. Usually, these service contracts do not cover regular maintenance items such as brakes, fluids, or filters. In some states, particularly Florida, the cost of such agreements is heavily regulated.

There are three main types of service contracts offered. The first is offered by the manufacturer through the dealership and is usually good at any dealership in the US that has that same franchise. When warranty repair work is required, the dealer submits a claim to the manufacturer and is reimbursed for the repair less the deductible paid by the consumer. Under this type of service agreement, there is usually no incentive for the dealer to do anything but repair the car as reimbursement from the manufacturer is usually profitable.

The second service contract is usually a simple insurance policy that the dealer purchases wholesale and is administered through a third party working for the dealer. This "third party" can often be a major insurance company. This money collected by the dealer from the consumer is put in a "reserve" fund for the length and/or term of the service contract. When a repair is required, the dealer authorizes the repair with the third-party administrator, usually before the repair is done. The third-party deducts the repair expense from the dealer's reserve fund. The fewer payments or deductions made on the service contract the greater the profit to the dealer as any unused portion of the "reserve" is given back to the original selling dealer less an administration fee when the service contract retires.

The third type of service contract can be purchased directly from a few automobile insurance companies.

- GAP insurance: GAP insurance is protection for the loan in the event that the vehicle is lost as the result of an accident or theft. A GAP policy ensures that in the event of a total loss, the remaining payments are made on the loan so that a customer does not have to pay for a vehicle he or she no longer possesses. Many states regulate GAP insurance (New York, for example, does not allow dealerships to profit from the sale of GAP insurance).
- Credit/Life/Disability insurance: This kind of insurance is a profit center for the dealership, working similarly to the second type of service contract described above in this article and cannot be required as a condition of the loan. Customers / Borrowers often have the option of purchasing protection for their loan should the borrower become disabled and unable to work for a period during the time the borrower is required to make payments. Often the coverage begins on the 31st or 32nd day of disability: Meaning the borrower has to be unable to work for a period greater than 30 days before a claim can be filed. Often the borrower is required to submit paperwork to validate a disability claim. Credit Life insurance will usually cover the entire remaining balance of a loan if the borrower dies within the term of the contract. Customers can often obtain this coverage from their own insurance companies. Consumers should compare rates and policies with their own insurance companies. See Consumer Reports for their opinion
- Aftermarket accessories: Many dealerships offer accessories that are not offered by the manufacturer directly. These can be dangerous for consumers as some dealerships engage in illegal "payment packing"---that is, quoting an inflated monthly payment for the car in order to entice customers to agree to purchase aftermarket products offered at inaccurately low costs. One salesman for an accessories distributor was fired after he started asking questions about the legality of this practice; the resulting jury verdict of $480,003 against his former employer for wrongful termination in violation of public policy was upheld in full by a California appellate court in 2007. As with Credit/Life/Disability insurance, there are many ways a consumer can purchase these options outside the dealership.
- Maintenance agreements: Many dealerships that have their own service shops will offer pre-paid maintenance agreements. These are sometimes offered directly through the manufacturer (such as Saturn's Basic Care or Car Care programs) or by the dealership alone. Because of the vast differences in programs that can exist from dealership to dealership, it is important to know what is covered under the plan and what are the recommended service intervals (see below).
- Lease Here Pay Here Contracts: With lease-to-purchase programs, customers are given a vehicle to lease for a time period that can range from 12 months up to 36 months. These vehicles are used as opposed to new ones typically obtained from a new car dealer. The dealership that leases these cars is often scrutinized due to the fact that they normally serve the public that does not have strong financial abilities to maintain the obligation.

The dealers are not held to the lending standards that most banks are, and also at times of bankruptcy are completely exempt in times of default leading the car dealership with the opportunity to repossess at any time regardless of breach of contract. Some other pro-advocates say the monthly obligation on leases is cheaper because there are no sales taxes on the vehicle as opposed to the amount a buyer may pay if they are making loan payments on a new or used car purchase.

Car dealers also provide maintenance and in some cases, repair services for cars. New car dealerships are more likely to provide these services since they usually stock and sell parts and process warranty claims for the manufacturers they represent. Maintenance is typically a high-margin service and represents a significant profit center for automotive dealers.

== Regulation ==
In the United States, most aspects of operating a car dealership are regulated at the state level. Car titles are issued and transferred by the individual states through their respective Departments of Motor Vehicles. The purchase price of a vehicle usually includes various fees which the dealer forwards to the state DMV to transfer the vehicle's title to the buyer. In many states, the DMVs also license and regulate car dealerships. In many states, car dealerships are capable of submitting all necessary forms to the DMV on behalf of the customer and are authorized to issue temporary paperwork to the customer to prove that the transaction is in process, allowing the customer to avoid a trip to the nearest DMV office.

Consumer complaints against car dealerships are usually investigated by the Attorney General's office in the state where the dealership is located. In states where the DMV licenses and regulates car dealerships, the DMV may have responsibility for initially handling consumer complaints and the state AG's office becomes involved only when there is evidence that a dealer may have committed a crime.

== Perceptions ==
=== Customer experience ===
According to one survey, more than half of dealership customers would prefer to buy directly from the manufacturer, without any monetary incentives to do so. An analyst report of a direct sales model is estimated to cut the cost of a vehicle by 8.6%. This implies an even greater demand currently exists for a direct manufacturer sales model. However, laws in many U.S. states prohibit manufacturers from selling directly, requiring customers to buy new cars through a dealer.

=== Discrimination ===
Studies have found that some auto dealerships charge higher interest rates or otherwise raise their prices to females and ethnic minorities, including Asians, and African Americans. These issues have sometimes resulted in lawsuits, including class action lawsuits, against the dealers on the basis of discrimination based on nationality.

== Largest dealerships ==
=== New cars ===
2024 stats

1. Lithia Motors - 729,799 units
2. AutoNation - 591,265 units
3. Penske Automotive Group - 587,483 units
4. Group 1 Automotive - 406,985 units
5. Sonic Automotive - 315,473 units
6. Asbury Automotive Group - 277,016 units
7. Hendrick Automotive - 260,497 units
8. Morgan Auto Group - 201,927 units
9. Ken Garff Automotive Group - 149,395 units
10. Staluppi Auto Group - 86,329 units

=== Used cars ===
2023 stats

1. Lithia Motors - 325,764 units
2. AutoNation - 274,019 units
3. Penske Automotive Group - 256,721 units
4. Group 1 Automotive - 199,963 units
5. Sonic Automotive - 173,886 units
6. Asbury Automotive Group - 127,507 units
7. Hendrick Automotive - 95,676 units
8. Morgan Auto Group - 85,207
9. Ken Garff Automotive Group - 56,163
10. Hudson Automotive Group - 54,200

Note: does not include online-only dealerships such as CarMax, Carvana or Vroom.
