= Rencher =

Rencher is a surname. Notable people with the surname include:

- Abraham Rencher (1798–1883), American politician
- Derek Rencher (1932–2014), British ballet dancer
- Terrence Rencher (born 1973), American basketball player
- Ronald L. Rencher (July 6, 1941), American politician
