= ABKO Properties =

ABKO Properties was a joint venture between Wichita, Kansas real estate entrepreneur George Ablah and Wichita-based Koch Industries formed specifically to purchase Chrysler Realty Corporation in the late 1970s from a hard-pressed Lee Iacocca. Koch Industries is ranked 2 among the Forbes list of largest private companies. Chrysler Realty Corporation purchases, leases or options dealership facilities and then leases or subleases these facilities to Chrysler dealers. The name ABKO was derived from the first two letters of Ablah's name and the first two letters of Charles Koch's name, who is head of Koch Industries. At the time ABKO was formed, Chrysler was on the verge of bankruptcy.

== History ==
ABKO purchased around 840 Chrysler automotive dealership sites around the country controlled by Iacocca in 1979 for slightly over $100 million in cash. Not all the sites were owned by Chrysler Realty.

Under the leadership of Ablah and his team, Chrysler Realty president Ed Homer (for a brief time), executive vice president Corliss (Corky) Nelson of Koch, acquisition/disposition specialists Wayne Delfino and Frank Mills, and attorney John Schippel, among others, ABKO set forth a strategy to diversify Chrysler Realty Corporation by way of liquidating non-performing Chrysler dealership properties by tax-free exchange and sale.

In 1983, Iacocca, assisted by a government bailout he organized, repurchased 446 of the dealerships in a measure aimed at strengthening the Chrysler dealer network. ABKO dissolved shortly thereafter.
