= Franklin W. Gunnell =

American politician (1915–1996)

Member of the Utah House of Representatives
- In office 1959–1971

Speaker of the Utah House of Representatives
- In office 1967–1969
- Preceded by: Kay C. Allen
- Succeeded by: Lorin N. Pace

Personal details
- Born: September 20, 1915 Wellsville, Utah, U.S.
- Died: June 8, 1996 (aged 80)
- Party: Republican
- Education: Utah State University

Franklin W. Gunnell (September 20, 1915 – June 8, 1996) was an American politician. He served as a Republican member of the Utah House of Representatives.

== Life and career ==
Gunnell was born in Wellsville, Utah. He attended Utah State University.

Gunnell served in the Utah House of Representatives from 1959 to 1971.

Gunnell died on June 8, 1996, at the age of 80.
