= Senator Baird =

Senator Baird may refer to:

== Members of the United States Senate ==
- David Baird Jr. (1881–1955), U.S. Senator from New Jersey
- David Baird Sr. (1839–1927), U.S. Senator from New Jersey

== United States state senate members ==
- Delpha Baird (born 1930), Utah State Senate
- John Baird (Michigan politician) (1859–1934), Michigan State Senate
- LaRoy Baird (1881–1950), North Dakota State Senate
- Samuel T. Baird (1861–1899), Louisiana State Senate
