= Senator Pace =

Senator Pace may refer to:

- Lorin N. Pace (1925–2026), Utah State Senate
- Stephen Pace (1891–1970), Georgia State Senate
- Tyler Pace (fl. 2010s), Arizona State Senate
- William W. Pace (1857–1931), Arizona State Senate
