= Nolan Karras =

American politician (born 1944)

Speaker of the Utah House of Representatives
- In office 1989–1990
- Preceded by: Glen E. Brown
- Succeeded by: Craig Moody

Member of the Utah House of Representatives
- In office 1981–1990

Personal details
- Born: December 30, 1944 (age 81) Ogden, Utah
- Education: Weber State College (BS); University of Utah (Master of Business Administration)

Nolan E. Karras (born December 30, 1944, in Ogden, Utah) is an American politician and businessman who served as a member of the Utah House of Representatives from 1981 to 1990.

== Early life and education ==
Karras earned a Bachelor of Science degree in Banking and Finance from Weber State College and MBA from the University of Utah in 1970.

== Career ==
Karras has been a member of the board of trustees of Weber State University since 2013 and chair since 2015. He served as a member of the Utah House of Representatives from 1981 to 1990, representing Roy, Utah. He held the office of Speaker of the House from 1989 to 1990. After leaving office, Karras was succeeded as Speaker by Craig Moody. Karras later served as a member of the Utah State Board of Regents for 12 years. He served as chairman from 2001 to 2005.

Karras ran for Governor of Utah in the 2004 Utah gubernatorial election, coming in second after diplomat Jon Huntsman Jr. in the Republican primary election. Karras had selected former Congresswoman Enid Greene Mickelsen as his running mate.

Karras was a member of the Board of Directors of Scottish Power, a corporation that operates as PacifiCorp in the United States.

== Personal life ==
Karras is a member of the Church of Jesus Christ of Latter-day Saints. He and his wife, Lynda Karras, have three children and 13 grandchildren.
