= Auto auction =

Selling auto vehicle

Auto auctions are a method of selling vehicles based on an auction system. Auto auctions can be found in most countries and are usually exclusive to licensed automobile dealers.

== Country specific ==
=== Japan ===
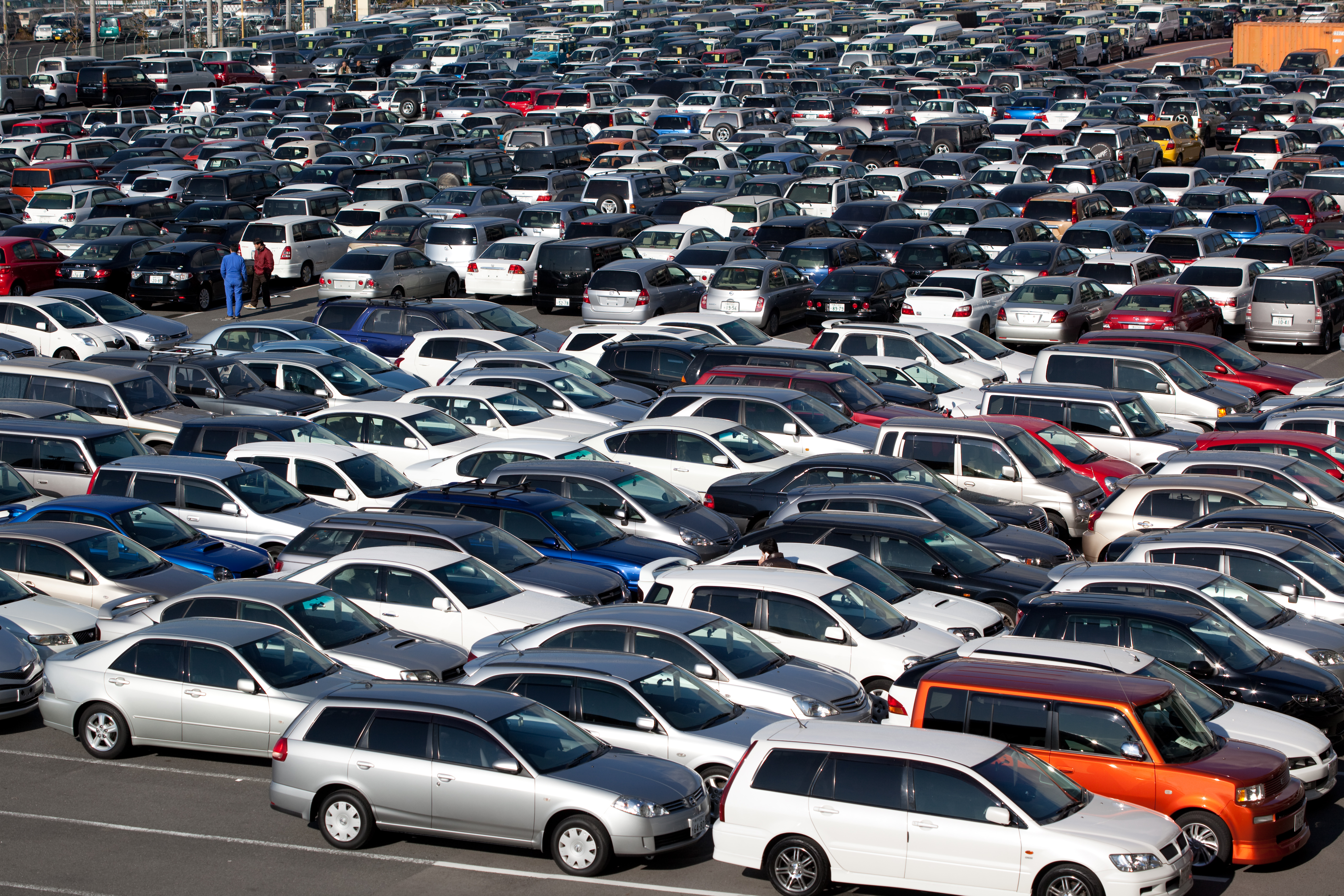
Parking lot at HAA Kobe

Auto auctions are the most popular method for selling used vehicles in Japan. Individuals, though, cannot directly use auto auctions, but must go through those holding auction membership. In Japanese law, only dealerships may become members of auto auctions. The system allows people to access information, but maintains order in the auctions by restricting bidding to professionals.

A small percentage of the dealers who are members of Japanese auto auctions are also used vehicle exporters, who use the auto auctions as their primary source of used vehicles. Other than these exporters, most members are usedvehicle dealerships that sell in Japan and are used by their customers to find a car they want.

In Japan, there were 30 auto auction groups and over 200 auto auction locations throughout Japan. Additionally, smaller auctions are held for specialized cars. Traditional auctions require scarce parking spaces in metropolitan locations and are time-consuming for bidders. Large numbers of cars in Japan are auctioned online, using various auction software.

The centralized, online AUCNET system was established to facilitate transactions using video and standardized inspector rating of cars. Auction inspection checklists allow buyers and inspectors to evaluate the worth of a car over such systems. The auctions do not involve car being individual driven one at a time but on numerous big screens displaying different vehicles at the same time with each bidder controlling a joystick to process information and determine their bid quickly.

=== United States ===
In the United States, auto auctions play a major role as a wholesale market for second-hand vehicles. Most states only allow closed auctions, meaning only dealers can use them. As of 2018, there were 139 used car-auction sites in the US open only to car dealers. There are also auctions that are open to the public in a few states like New Hampshire and Pennsylvania. These auctions are a primary outlet for financial services firms to dispose of their large volume of off-lease returns, for rental and other companies to sell off their aging fleets and for car dealerships to dump trade-ins or other unwanted inventory. Some auctions in the United States are used by banks, the IRS, and other government agencies to sell vehicles that were repossessed for failure to make monthly payments or pay taxes, or were seized by the FBI, DEA, or the police. Also, there are some that sell US Government vehicles and those catering to the salvage market where insurance companies sell totaled vehicles. Finally, there is a niche classic and luxury car market for $1 million-plus cars.

Online auto auctions are also growing in popularity. One of the most popular online auctions to buy cars from is eBay Motors. On eBay Motors, any user can create an account and put their vehicle(s) up for auction even if they are from a state that only allows closed auctions. There is usually a fee associated with selling a vehicle on eBay. Some buyers prefer to look for local car sellers on eBay, within a certain radius so that they can go and do a manual inspection of the vehicle. There are several cases of scams associated with popular online auctions.

With the reduction in travel in 2020 due to the COVID-19 pandemic, United States–based auto auctions companies, like Illinois-based Insurance Auto Auctions and Copart in Dallas, saw rapid growth as rental companies shrunk their fleets significantly. This has drawn some controversy, with numerous race tracks being sold and repurposed as storage facilities for these companies.

=== United Kingdom ===
The majority of vehicles entered into auction in the UK are ex-company fleet vehicles and as such usually have a good service history and have been well-kept. Car dealer groups also take advantage of auto auctions in order to sell on any excess stock whilst smaller, local car dealers will use them to fill spaces on their forecourts. Auctions in the UK are also used by banks, local and central Governments, private sellers, and car dealerships.

== Dealer auto auctions ==
A dealer auto auction is a specialized form of auction. Millions of vehicles are sold at such dealer auto auctions every year. These auctions are restricted to the general public and only licensed dealers can participate. Prices of vehicles sold at dealer auctions tend to be lower than those advertised on any dealer's lot. Sellers forgo a potentially higher sticker price to take their inventory to a dealer auction where it will be auctioned off for less than retail for a number of reasons.

Maintaining aging inventory costs dealers both money and reputation. Most vehicles sold are off-lease returns, replaced rental fleets, company cars, repossessed vehicles, and trade-ins.

- Off-lease: vehicles returned to the financial institution at the end of a lease term. Closed auctions are usually the only venue for such financial institutions to dispose of a large volume of end-of-lease returns. The terms of a lease normally put a restriction on the number of miles driven, require regular maintenance, and penalize for excessive wear. Usually, off-lease vehicles are returned within 2–3 years, often before their original factory warranty expires.
- Off-rental: rental car companies normally replace their fleets once a year, releasing a flood of late-model cars to the secondary market. Like the big financial institutions that underwrite car leases, rental companies also rely on auto auctions to sell off their used inventory. These vehicles tend to be well-maintained and driven for only one year. Mileage tends to accumulate quickly on a rental car. Optional features are limited to an A/C and automatic transmission, but these cars are otherwise as close to the base model as they can get. Usage of rental cars is rough; it is safe to assume that during that first year, each rental car will be driven by a normal distribution of all types of drivers in all kinds of conditions.
- Company/fleet cars: companies of varying sizes own or lease cars, trucks or vans that they typically keep for two or more years, although it is not uncommon to see current year models sold at the auctions. Adequate maintenance and large volumes of similar vehicles are typical characteristics. Like rentals, these fleet vehicles may not have many optional features and may get exploited on a daily basis. Unlike rentals, usage of company cars varies greatly from the luxury sedans driven carefully on occasion to delivery trucks that regularly mount curbs and gets abused in city traffic.
- Repossessed: vehicles can be voluntarily or involuntarily repossessed by financial institutions for several reasons, including late payments, undisclosed past credit issues, or failure to maintain full coverage insurance. Auto auctions are the most common method of disposing of repossessed vehicles. Repossessed vehicles can feasibly sell for less because the financial institution disposing of them only seeks to offset its losses (also restricted by federal regulations). The condition of such cars may be compromised by lack of maintenance. There is also the potential for sabotage from ill-meaning previous users (e.g., extensive keying or destruction of the interior).
- Trade-in: dealer inventory that is aging or does not meet their market positioning (e.g., an old car that was traded in for a new one at a different brand of franchised dealership). Traded-in cars sometimes have after market modifications that may affect their marketability. The overall condition of vehicles also varies. Some vehicles may be much older and out of warranty.
- Salvage: vehicles that have been in accidents, floods, fires, or recovered thefts that have been purchased by insurance companies. The insurance companies sell these vehicles to dealers or body shops who will fix them and resell them, or to auto recyclers who will part out the remaining parts of the vehicle that have not been damaged.

Among these types of vehicles, there are quality cars ready to market. Late models with remaining factory warranty are not uncommon. The law requires listing dealers to disclose bigger mechanical problems, which may void the manufacturer's warranty and classify the vehicle as junk, salvage, lemon/consumer buy-back, etc. There are special auctions for these types of vehicles (salvage, rebuilt, or junk vehicles), sold mostly by insurance companies. Other types of auctions specialize in the sale of police or government cars; some of those allow public access.

=== Pricing ===
Regardless of their source, vehicles are sent to auction with the main purpose to be sold quickly and hassle-free, and this usually happens at prices that dealers can easily recoup with a small profit from a resale. Contrary to popular belief, cars seldom sell for unreasonably low prices at dealer auctions. This may happen if there are not enough interested bidders or if the vehicle is exceptionally unattractive and should not be taken for granted. Many sellers put reserve prices on their stock specifically to prevent this from happening. The reserve price is not disclosed publicly and a “winning” auction offer price is only considered a sale if the reserve price is met. Sellers have the option to re-list vehicles that did not sell at a particular auction.

=== Condition ===
As with any used vehicle, overall vehicle condition varies greatly. Many aspects of a vehicle's appearance may suffer in the term of everyday use and result in any of the following damages: stained or otherwise used upholstery, scratched bumpers, dings on the doors, chipped hood, dented quarter panels. Most of these can be fixed with touch-up paint and/or a dent removing kit. Scraped wheels and worn tires may cost more to repair or replace.

=== Inspection ===
Pre-sale vehicle inspection or test-driving is allowed at some auctions. Some auction locations inspect and prepare the cars for sale if the listing dealer so chooses (at a premium). More extensive reconditioning is also available. Many auctions offer (for a fee) post-sale inspections for qualifying vehicles that can determine mechanical or frame damage issues and allow the buying dealer a window of opportunity to back out of the purchase. On the other end, sellers can also (for a fee) have their vehicles pre-sale inspected which allows purchasing dealers to buy with confidence that the vehicle passed a pre-sale inspection and is free of mechanical or frame damage issues.

=== Inventory finance ===
Most car dealerships do not pay cash for the vehicles they buy at auto auctions. They rely on inventory financing, a line of credit extended by a bank or other institution to acquire vehicles. This is known in industry parlance as floorplanning (floor planning) or simply "flooring" vehicle inventory. Specialty finance companies cater to the used car dealer industry.

=== Auction Announcements ===
Auto Auction announcements are usually displayed on a screen behind the auction block. Auction announcements contain information to help Dealers make better informed decisions. These announcements can offer information about the vehicles history, such as former Taxi or Fleet use, the vehicles Title status, such as Title Absent, Salvage or Buy Back, and if the vehicle has any major mechanical issues. Auction announcements may also use a light system consisting of red, yellow, and green to draw attention to additional information. This information may pertain to liens, odometer discrepancies, and other vehicle issues.

== See also ==
- Most expensive cars sold in auction
- Online auction
