= Buy here, pay here =

Type of used car dealership

In the used car market in the United States and Canada, buy here, pay here, often abbreviated as BHPH, refers to a method of running an automobile dealership in which dealers themselves extend credit to purchasers of automobiles. Typically, purchasers of cars at BHPH dealerships have poor credit history, and loans have high interest rates. BHPH can provide options for those unable to meet credit standards elsewhere.

== History and background ==
The BHPH Industry originated primarily in the early 1970s during the United States savings and loan crisis. With many similarities to the 2008 financial crisis, credit was difficult to obtain, unemployment was rising, and the economy was still in a transformation from a production-based economy to a service-based economy.

Automobile dealers who still wanted to sell cars had to find a way to deal with the increasing price of vehicles relative to income. They had to sell these vehicles to wary consumers who were unwilling or unable to pay cash for the new purchase at the point of purchase. In many cases, when banks would not lend to the consumer, the automobile dealer would start a related finance company (RFC) and have the finance company approve the loan on the vehicle. This represented a step into the consumer finance business for automobile dealers. The advantage to the dealership of having an RFC finance was decreased risk on the sale and finance of the vehicles sold. Since both the RFC and the dealership had the same ownership, the owners could benefit from the profit on the sale of the vehicle and the profit on the loan for the vehicle. Historically, the down payment required on a BHPH loan was generally larger than the total profit on the sale of the vehicle. Therefore, if the buyer didn’t make payments, the RFC could repossess the vehicle and sell it again at the dealership. Since 2008, many outside lending institutions have entered the market and the average down payment on a BHPH loan has significantly decreased, as dealers try to maintain a share of the market. Many of the benefits of separating the RFC out from the BHPH dealership are based in the tax code changes of the Tax Reform Act of 1986. The Act restricted any companies that utilize inventory in their operating business from using cash accounting.

== Issues ==
Due to the high upfront cost of securing inventory, automobile dealerships frequently have a problem managing their cash flow. Often, used car dealerships purchase inventory using a retail floorplan, a type of specialty line of credit, that typically requires the automobile to be paid off in full within 90 days of purchase. This means that automobile dealers use loans to finance their operations and therefore have an interest in selling vehicles as quickly as possible in order to use the proceeds to pay off the loan rather than paying off the loan out of their working capital. One difficulty that this presents to BHPH dealers is that when they sell a vehicle to a BHPH customer, the RFC needs to produce the loan funds so the dealership will have the funds to pay off the line of credit on that automobile. Often a ‘cash crunch’ is a primary reason for dealerships to go out of business.

== Regulations in the United States ==
Related finance companies are not regulated as strictly as banks by the Federal Reserve, rather they are regulated by the Department of Financial Institutions or Department of Commerce on a State level depending on the State. Regulations may include maximum interest rate, late fee amounts, grace periods and so forth. Some of the companies that have started as RFCs have grown large enough that they became Industrial Banks which are FDIC Insured banks owned by non-financial institutions.
