= GM Financial =

American auto lender

General Motors Financial Company, Inc.
- Formerly: AmeriCredit Corporation
- Type: Subsidiary
- Industry: Financial services
- Founded: 1992; 34 years ago
- Headquarters: Burnett Plaza, Fort Worth, Texas, U.S.
- Area served: United States, Latin America, Canada, China
- Key people: Susan Sheffield (CEO)
- Products: Automobile financing
- Revenue: ▲US$ 17.259 billion (2025)
- Operating income: ▲US$ 2.824 billion (2025)
- Net income: ▲US$ 2.058 billion (2025)
- Total assets: ▼US$ 140.477 billion (2025)
- Total equity: ▲US$ 15,813 billion (2025)
- Number of employees: 9,000+ (2026)
- Parent: General Motors
- Website: gmfinancial.com

General Motors Financial Company, Inc. is the financial services arm of General Motors. The company is a global provider of auto finance, with operations in the United States, Mexico, Latin America, Canada, and China. Operations in Europe were sold to PSA Groupe and BNP Paribas following the sale of GM's core area businesses Opel and Vauxhall in a $2.2 billion deal. The company is headquartered in Fort Worth, Texas, where it is downtown Fort Worth's largest employer.

Founded in 1992 as AmeriCredit Corp., the company was acquired by GM in October 2010 and renamed General Motors Financial Company, Inc. The company provides retail loan and lease programs through auto dealers for customers across the credit spectrum. They also offer commercial lending products, such as retail floorplan, construction and real estate loans, or insurance for car dealerships.

Before its acquisition by GM, the company ranked at 768 on the Fortune 1000.

== Acquisition by General Motors ==
In July 2010, General Motors entered into a definitive agreement to acquire AmeriCredit in an all-cash transaction valued at approximately $3.5 billion. The deal provided GM with a new financial arm to replace the loss of GMAC (now Ally Financial) in 2006. Following the approval of the deal by AmeriCredit shareholders, GM renamed the company "GM Financial" on October 1, 2010.

On September 4, 2014, GM and GM Financial announced it entered into a support agreement providing for leverage limits and liquidity support to GM Financial if needed, as well as other general terms of support. Under the terms of the agreement, as GM Financial expands its product portfolio and grows its business, GM committed to provide funding to GM Financial if its earning assets leverage ratio rises above pre-determined thresholds. GM extended an intercompany revolving credit facility to GM Financial to provide up to $1 billion of liquidity if needed. This facility, which is subordinate to GM Financial's senior unsecured and secured debt, will replace an existing $600 million line of credit from GM. The agreement also provides that GM will use its commercially reasonable efforts to ensure that GM Financial will continue to be designated as a subsidiary borrower on up to $4 billion of GM's corporate revolving line of credit.

Since being acquired by GM in 2010, GM Financial has significantly increased its share of GM's business which now represents 75 percent of GM Financial's consumer loan and lease originations.

On August 11, 2020, Standard & Poor's Ratings Services revised the credit ratings of both GM and GM Financial to stable from negative and affirmed the automaker's BBB issuer credit rating and issuer level ratings. On June 18, 2015, Fitch Ratings upgraded the credit ratings of both GM and GM Financial with a stable outlook. The new GM corporate and GM Financial credit rating is BBB−.

== General Motors Insurance ==
General Motors Insurance started its operations in 2021 as a subsidiary and rapidly expanding throughout the United States. GM Insurance hired seasoned executives from Elephant Insurance, Allstate, and Nationwide Insurance.

== International operations ==
In April 2011, GM Financial acquired FinanciaLinx, one of the largest independent leasing companies in Canada, to expand product offerings into Canada. FinanciaLinx operates as a subsidiary of GM Financial.

In November 2012, GM Financial announced the acquisition of Ally Financial's international assets. The transaction includes operations in Austria, Belgium, Brazil, Chile, Colombia, France, Germany, Greece, Italy, Mexico, the Netherlands, Peru, Portugal, Spain, Sweden, Switzerland and the United Kingdom. It also includes Ally's 40-percent interest in its Chinese joint venture GMAC-SAIC Motor. The majority of those assets were closed in 2013, with the remaining portion, an equity interest in a joint venture in China, completed January 2, 2015.

In March 2017, the European arm of GM Financial was sold to Groupe PSA and BNP Paribas following the sale of GM's core area businesses Opel and Vauxhall Motors in a $2.2 billion deal.

== Industrial bank charter ==
After initially applying in December 2020 and later restructuring the submission to address regulatory feedback, GM Financial officially refiled its bank application in January 2025. On January 22, 2026, the Federal Deposit Insurance Corporation (FDIC) granted final conditional approval for the deposit insurance application to establish GM Financial Bank as a Utah-chartered industrial bank.

The bank operates nationwide under the supervision of the Utah Department of Financial Institutions (UDFI). Its main purpose is to support GM's auto financing business by gathering stable funding through consumer savings accounts and online certificates of deposit (CDs), which are then used to fund auto loans for customers and credit lines for dealerships.
