= Delpha Baird =

American politician (born 1930)

Delpha A. Baird

Member of the Utah Senate from the 9th district
- In office 1991–1995

Personal details
- Born: December 13, 1930 (age 95) Brigham City, Utah, U.S.
- Party: Republican
- Spouse: Steven T. Baird (m.1951–2011; his death)

Delpha Andersen Baird (née Andersen; December 13, 1930) is an American retired politician who was a Republican member of the Utah State Senate.

Baird defeated incumbent Lorin Pace in the 1990 Republican primary and was elected to the Utah State Senate for the 9th district. She was known for being an advocate for child/youth issues and served as Chairwoman of the Judiciary Committee. Baird was defeated by L. Stephen Poulton in a 1994 primary. She has nine children and 43 grandchildren.
