= Melissa Garff Ballard =

American politician

Melissa Ballard
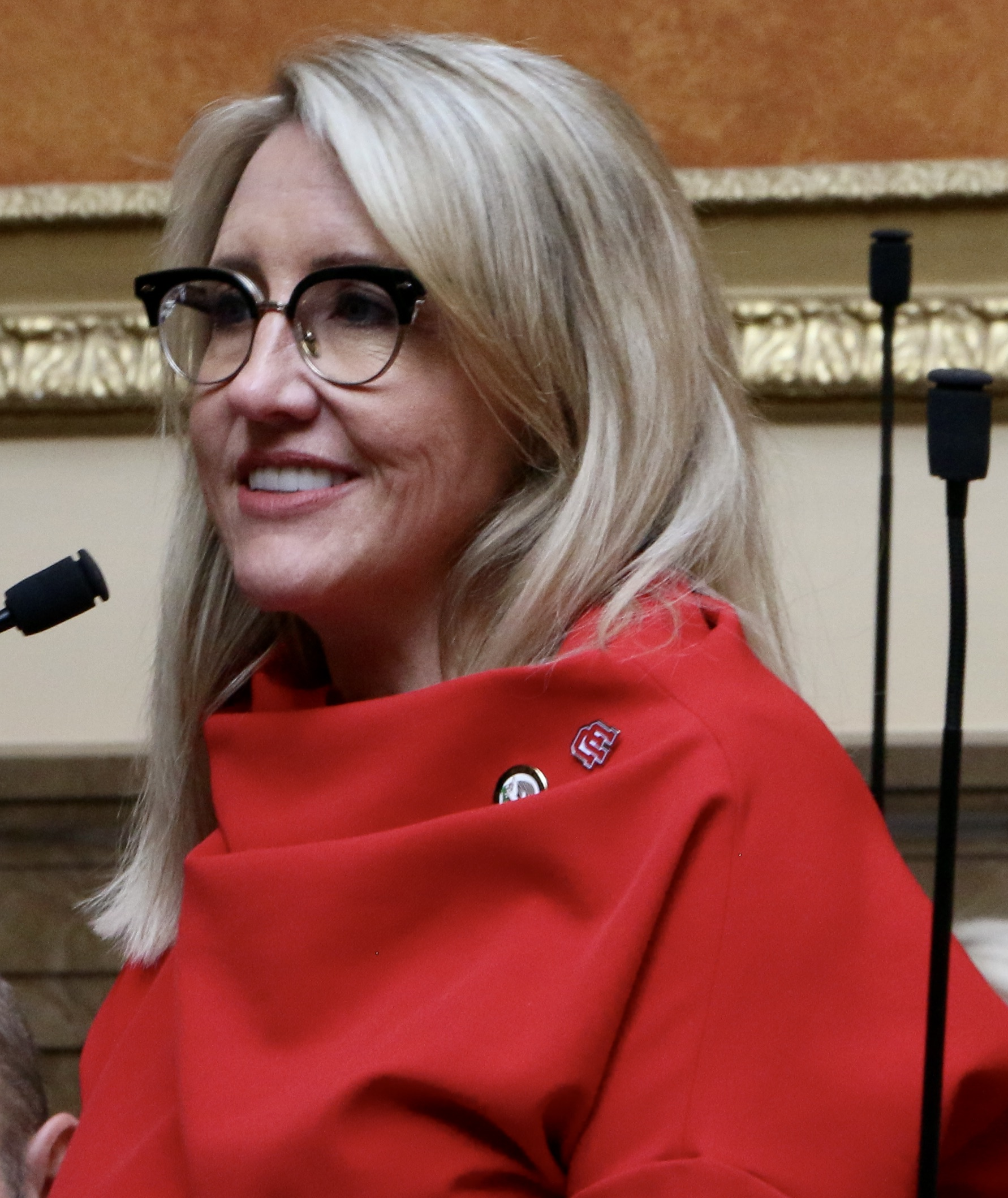

Member of the Utah House of Representatives from the 20th district
- Incumbent
- Assumed office January 1, 2019
- Preceded by: Becky Edwards
- Succeeded by: Phil Graves (elect)

Personal details
- Born: Melissa Garff Davis County, Utah, U.S.
- Party: Republican
- Spouse: Craig Ballard
- Children: 6
- Relatives: Robert H. Garff (father); M. Russell Ballard (father-in-law)
- Education: University of Utah (BM, MM)

Melissa Garff Ballard is an American politician and music educator who has been serving as a member of the Utah House of Representatives for the 20th district since January 1, 2019.

== Early life and education ==
Melissa Garff Ballard was born and raised in Davis County, Utah, the daughter of politician, businessman, and religious leader Robert H. Garff. During her youth, Ballard lived in England for three years while her father was president of the England Coventry Mission for the Church of Jesus Christ of Latter-day Saints (LDS Church). Later, she attended the University of Utah, where she graduated with a bachelor's degree in Piano Performance and a Master of Music in Piano Performance and Accompanying.

== Career ==
Ballard was the Founding Chair of the University of Utah School of Music Advisory Board and Camarata Awards. She managed a professional piano studio for more than 23 years. She is a certified MTNA and released an album in 2020 with Centaur Records, collaborating with violinist David Park. Their album received the 2020 National Critic’s Choice Award from the American Record Guide. They performed in New York City's Carnegie Hall on October 13, 2023.

She served on the advisory board for Salt Lake CAP Head Start for six years.

== Political career ==
Ballard was elected to the Utah House of Representatives in November 2018, after winning the Republican party nomination for the seat in a three-way race in June 2018. She was elected to the Utah House in November, after defeating Democrat Ryan L. Jones with 65% of the vote.

In 2019, Ballard sponsored a bill which would reform the Utah State Board of Education by (1) reducing the number of board members from 15 to 9; (2) having board members appointed by the governor and ratified by the senate, and eliminating popular elections to the board; (3) setting a two-term limit for board members; (4) reconstituting the board so it had one representative from each of Utah's congressional districts, one representative from charter schools, and four at-large representatives, instead of each board member representing a geographical district. The Education Committee voted against the bill 12–3.

In 2021, Ballard sponsored HB 223, Alternative Fuel Incentives Amendments, to create new tax credits for hydrogen vehicles in Utah. The bill passed the legislature and was signed by Governor Spencer J. Cox.

In the 2022 legislative session, Ballard was a member of the House Education and the House Transportation committees, and was House Vice Chair of the Higher Education Appropriations Subcommittee.

Her legislative service also includes being Chair of the Higher Education Appropriations, along with membership on the Public Education Standing, Transportation Standing, Criminal Justice and Law Enforcement Standing, Business and Labor Standing, and the Economic and Workforce Development Standing committees. She serves as Chair of the Education and Mental Health Commission, the Behavioral Crisis Response Commission, Chair of the Corrections and Higher Education Council, and Chair of the Utah Marriage Commission. She also serves on the Utah Education Commission, and the Western Interstate Commission for Higher Education.

She has worked to improve government efficiencies, prison reform, conservative energy policy.

== Personal life ==
Ballard lives in North Salt Lake, Utah. She is a member of the LDS Church and served with her husband, Craig Ballard, when he was president of the Oregon Portland Mission from 2014 to 2017. Her husband is the son of M. Russell Ballard, the former acting president of the LDS Church's Quorum of the Twelve Apostles. Ballard and her husband are the parents of six children.

Ballard's father, Robert Garff, died on March 29, 2020, of COVID-19.
