= Ronald L. Rencher =

American politician (1941–2023)

Member of the Utah House of Representatives
- In office 1971–1976

Speaker of the Utah House of Representatives
- In office 1975–1976
- Preceded by: Howard C. Nielson
- Succeeded by: Glade M. Sowards

United States Attorney for the District of Utah
- In office 1977–1981
- President: Jimmy Carter
- Preceded by: Ramon M. Child
- Succeeded by: Brent D. Ward

Personal details
- Born: July 6, 1941 Hawthorne, California, U.S.
- Died: September 11, 2023 (aged 82)
- Party: Democratic
- Education: University of Colorado Law School; Brigham Young University; University of Utah

Ronald L. Rencher (July 6, 1941 – September 11, 2023) was an American politician. He served as a Democratic member of the Utah House of Representatives.

He is the most recent Democratic speaker of the Utah House of Representatives.

== Life and career ==
Rencher was born in Hawthorne, California. He attended the University of Colorado Law School, Brigham Young University and the University of Utah.

Rencher served in the Utah House of Representatives from 1971 to 1976.

In 1977, Rencher served as United States Attorney for the District of Utah, serving until 1981.

]Rencher died on September 11, 2023, at the age of 82.
