= Glen E. Brown =

American politician (born 1943)

Speaker of the Utah House of Representatives
- In office 1987–1989
- Preceded by: Robert H. Garff
- Succeeded by: Nolan E. Karras

Member of the Utah House of Representatives
- In office 1977–1992

Personal details
- Born: April 15, 1943 (age 83) Coalville, Utah, U.S.
- Party: Republican
- Spouse: Frankie Jean
- Children: 4
- Education: Weber State University, Utah State University
- Occupation: dairy farmer

Glen E. Brown (born April 15, 1943) is an American former politician in the state of Utah. He served in the Utah House of Representatives from 1977 to 1992, during which time he served stints as majority whip, majority leader, and Speaker of the House. Brown is a dairy farmer, having received a bachelor's degree in animal husbandry from Utah State University in 1966. Prior to serving in the state house, he was the Summit County, Utah Republican party chairman.
