= Enrico Garff =

Italian painter (1939–2024)

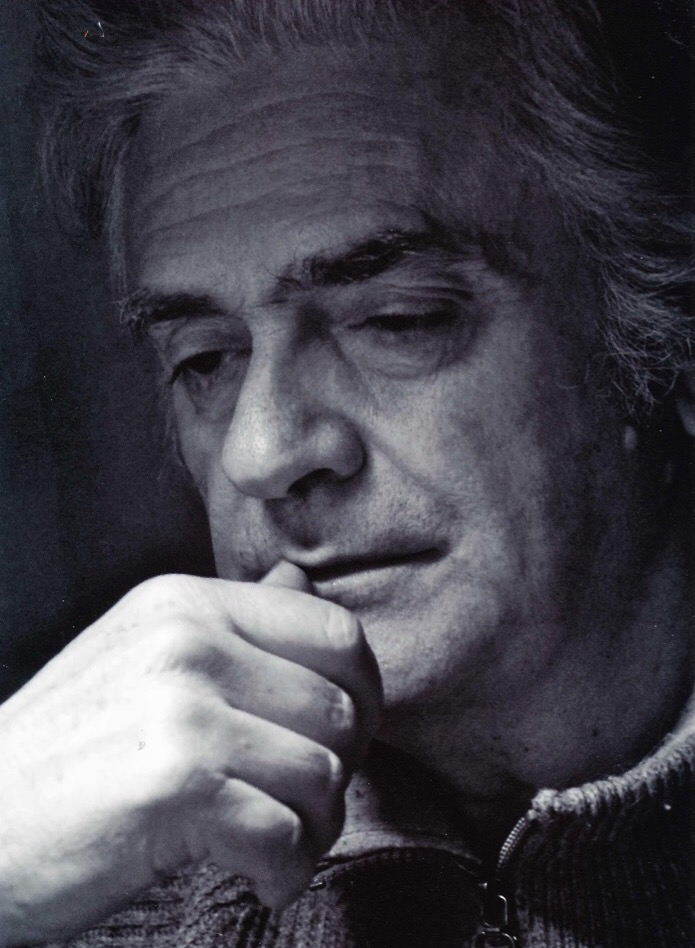
Garff in 2018

Enrico Garff (26 November 1939 – 1 September 2024) was an Italian portrait painter and colourist. Garff worked as an artist in Positano, Sorrento, Rome, Sicily and in Sweden and Finland.

His works include oils, watercolours, acrylics, gouaches and paintings on silk.

== Biography ==
Enrico Garff was born in Rome, Italy in 1939. His father, Emilio Boffi, was an opera singer and his mother, Gertrud Garff, had moved to Rome to study lyrical singing.

In 1969 took his degree at the L'Orientale", Università degli Studi di Napoli "L'Orientale" with a doctoral thesis on the Swedish poet Carl Snoilsky.

In 1970 Garff married Isabella Diana Gripenberg who was the granddaughter of the poet Bertel Gripenberg.

Garff died at a nursing home in Helsinki, on 1 September 2024, after breaking both his thigh bones in May 2021b at the age of 84.

Art critic Nino del Prete wrote that Garff's pallette was the chromatically richest one possibly could imagine. In 1972 in an article in the summer supplement of the daily paper Il Messaggero, N. Nobiloni wrote that the oil painting, ‘Quercia Falconieri,’ which brought Enrico Garff the second prize of the ‘Concorso Internazionale di Pittura Italia 2000’, depicts a famous oak at the gate of Villa Falconieri in Frascati.

In 1978 he rented a small house in Grottaferrata for his wife and children.

In 1981 Garff was in Italy and exhibited a series of new paintings in collaboration with Jano Barbagallo and Gianni Pennisi in the Galleria La Spirale in Acireale. He also had an exhibition in the Palazzo Corvaja in Taormina in May and June 1981.

In 1989 Garff founded the Gruppo Zuleika, Colourists of New Intuition, together with Romeo Mesisca, a disciple of Renato Guttuso in collaboration with two other artists. After a short exhibition in the private apartment of the Swedish minister of culture in Rome, the Gruppo Zuleika put 100 paintings on display in Villa Aurinko in Capena.

In 2005 he ran an exhibition at the Maunula St. Peter Christian Assembly Church in Helsinki.

In Helsinki his painting "The Return of Marcus Aurelius" was donated to the presidential residence at Mäntyniemi in Helsinki.

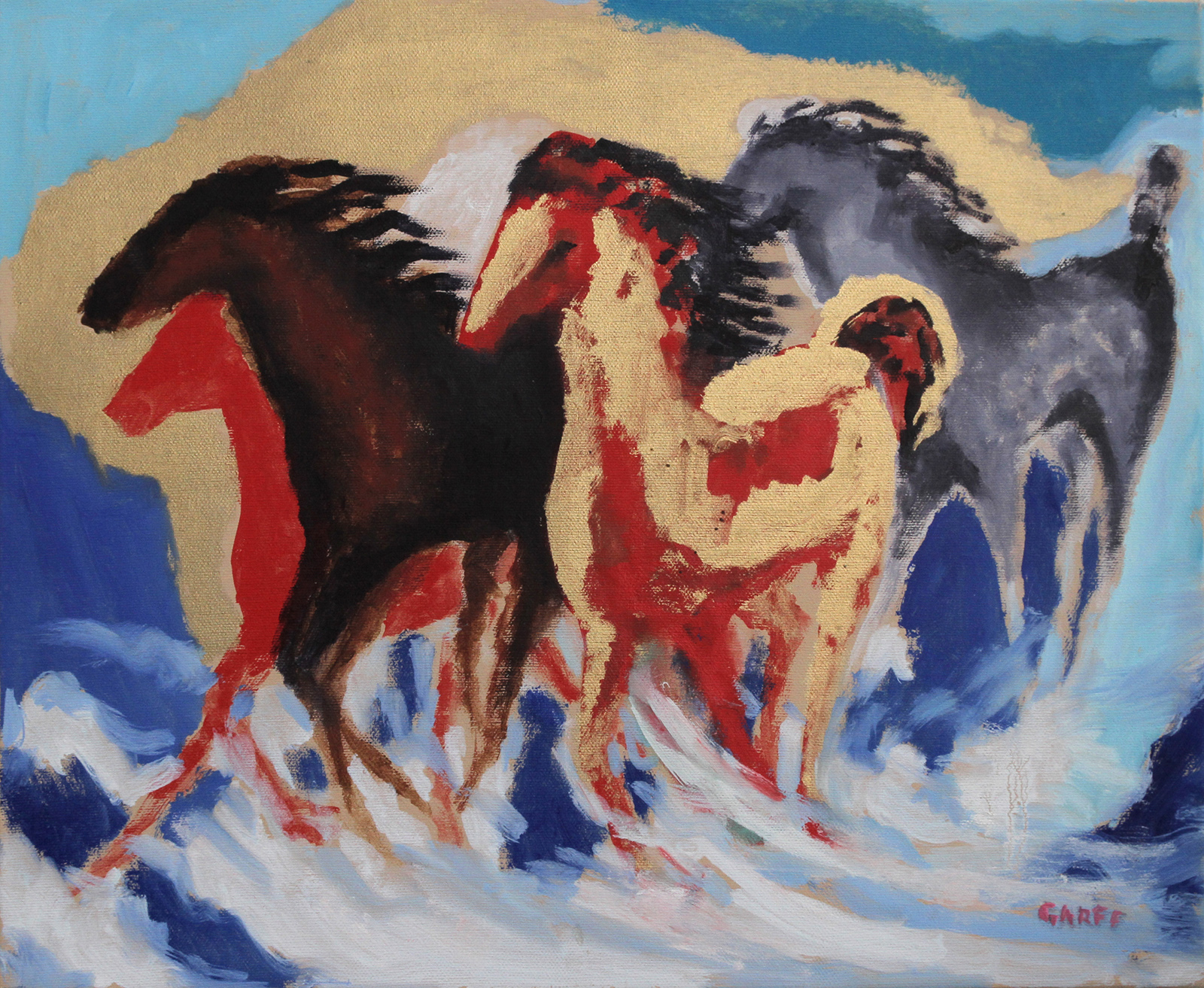
Five Horses, 2014

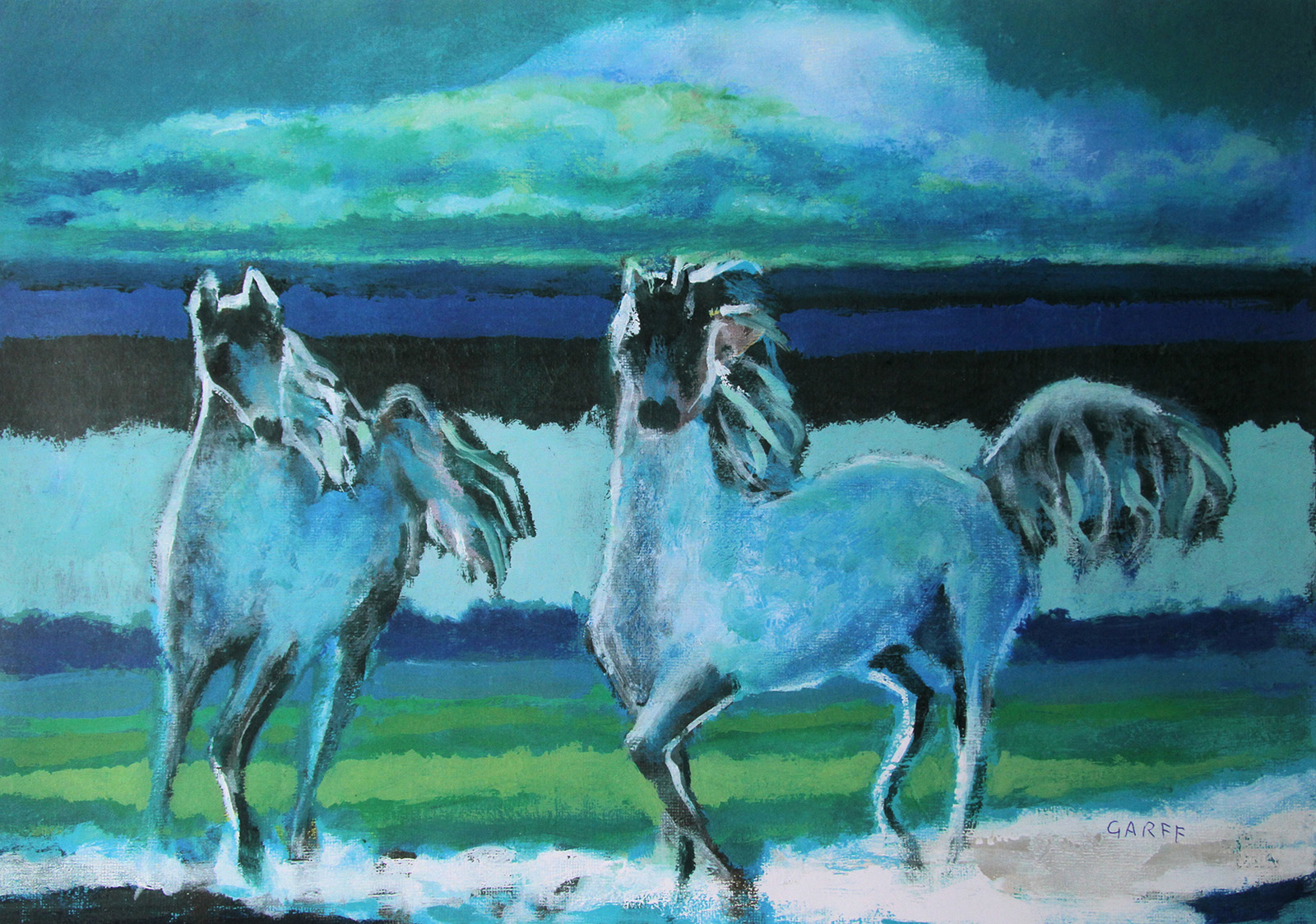
Donna Giada and the Duke of Coimbra
