= Craig Moody =

H. Craig Moody was the speaker of the Utah House of Representatives from 1991–1993.

Moody served as a member of the Utah House of Representative from 1983–1993. He decided not to run for re-election in 1992. In the late 1980s Moody was tapped by Republican Party leaders to counteract the hard hitting campaign strategies of Democratic Party State Chairman Randy Horiuchi.

In 1995, Moody became a director of Security National Financial Corporation. He also formed Moody and Associates, a firm that is involved in political consulting and real estate.

Moody has a bachelor's degree in political science from the University of Utah.

== Sources ==
- Deseret News, Nov. 23, 1991
- Forbes profile
