= Ken Garff =

American businessman (1906–1997)

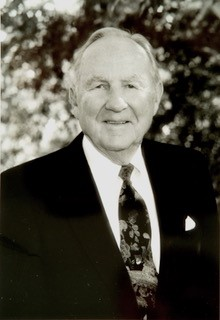
- Garff in 1992
- Born: Kendall Day Garff; July 18, 1906; Draper, Utah, U.S.
- Died: March 14, 1997 (aged 90)
- Resting place: Wasatch Lawn Memorial Park, Salt Lake City, Utah
- Known for: Car dealerships
- Spouses: Marjorie Heiner (m. 1932; died 1976) Betty June Morgan (m. 1977)
- Children: 3, including Robert
- Awards: Silver Beaver

Kendall Day Garff (July 18, 1906 – March 14, 1997) was an American businessman who owned several automobile dealerships along the Wasatch Front in Utah.

== Biography ==
Garff was born in Draper, Utah. He was a member of the Church of Jesus Christ of Latter-day Saints (LDS Church), for which he served as a missionary in Great Britain and Northern Ireland from 1926 to 1928. He graduated from the University of Utah with a BA in Social and Behavioral Science in 1932.

Garff married Marjorie Heiner in 1932 in the Salt Lake Temple and they had three children. Marjorie was ill for many years and died in 1976. Garff remarried Betty June Morgan in 1977.

Before selling cars, Garff worked as a Shell service station attendant in Salt Lake City, Utah. After an explosion, the station closed for reconstruction and Garff began selling used cars to support himself and founded his company in 1932. He would buy cars in Chicago and bring them back to sell in Salt Lake. In the 1940s, he opened dealerships to sell new cars, starting with Studebaker cars and trucks in 1937, and Oldsmobile in 1946.

Garff's son, Robert H. Garff, was his successor in running the company.

=== Industry and community ===
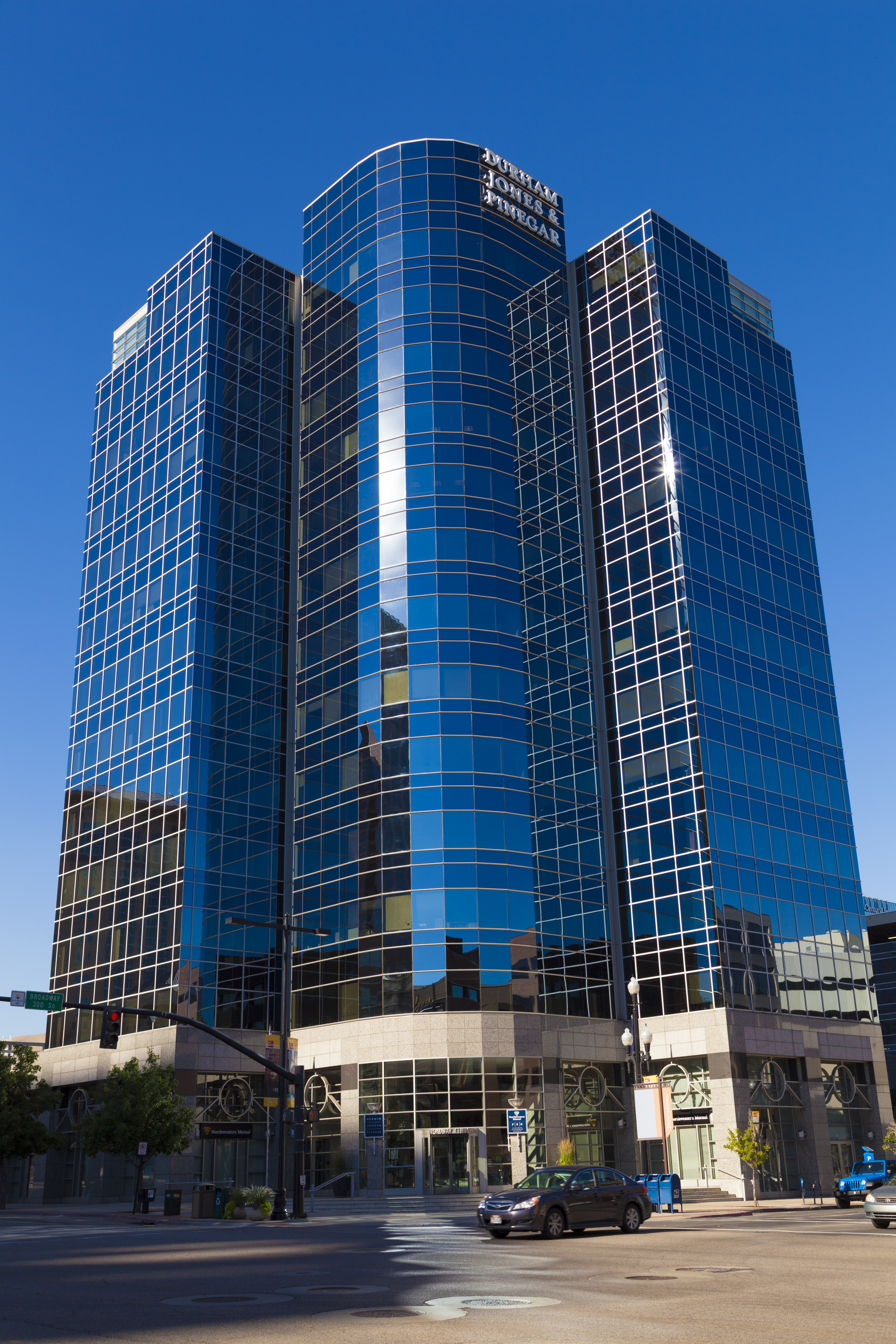
Garff Automotive Tower

Besides his own involvement with Garff Enterprises, Garff's other businesses included the Deseret Livestock Company and Skull Valley Ranches. He served as director of First Security Corporation for 25 years, president of Fidelity American Life Insurance Co., and director of Detroiter Mobile Homes, the world's largest mobile home dealer for some time.

Garff was active in community and civic service, including as president of the Utah Automobile Dealers Association, executive director of the Boy Scouts of America national board, chairman of the Utah Republican Party for two decades, YMCA board of directors, Brigham Young University Achievement Council, and the University of Utah's National Advisory Council, National Board of Advisors, and Business School Advisory Committee. In 1978, he established a $500,000 chair at the University of Utah's Graduate College of Business, which later named a wing of its facilities the Kendall D. Garff Building in his honor.

Garff received various honors for his accomplishments and activities. The University of Utah awarded him the School of Business Outstanding Achievement Award in 1961, the Emeritus Award in 1972, the Distinguished Alumnus Award in 1979, and an Honorary Doctor of Laws Degree in 1989. He was also inducted into the Beehive Hall of Fame in 1996 and received the Silver Beaver Award from the Boy Scouts of America. Garff was an Honorary Colonel in the Utah National Guard and for 12 years was Honorary Consul for the Federal Republic of West Germany.

== Dealership conglomerate ==
The Ken Garff Automotive Group is a large car dealership conglomerate. The company, or one of its dealerships, according to a January 2004 survey conducted by Dan Jones & Associates, was the second-most mentioned car dealership by Utahns when asked to name a car dealer after Larry H. Miller Dealerships. The company is currently associated with 26 car dealerships in Utah. Kendall's grandson, John Garff, is currently the president of the company.
