= Retail floorplan =

Loan to cover high-cost inventory

Retail floor planning (also referred to as floorplanning or inventory financing) is a type of short term loan used by retailers to purchase high-cost inventory such as automobiles. These loans are often secured by the inventory purchased as collateral.

Floor planning is commonly used in new and used car dealerships. Contrary to common perceptions, most car dealers do not pay cash for the vehicles on their lot. Even smaller dealerships can have an inventory of vehicles representing millions of dollars of capital investment.

Most car dealerships use a floorplan facility to finance their inventory and factor the cost of the facility into the price presented to the consumer. The practice of using floorplan loans to finance inventory creates an incentive for the dealers to sell vehicles as quickly as possible in order to reduce the amount of interest that will accrue on the floored vehicle. Floor planning costs can run into hundreds of thousands of dollars a month for a big multi-location dealer with large inventories.

In the case of new vehicles, they are generally floor planned by the manufacturer, such as Ally Financial (formerly GMAC). With used car dealers, specialty finance companies cater to their industry.

Rather than offering loans for each individual vehicle purchase, most floor planning companies supply dealers with a revolving line of credit that they can use to acquire inventory, such as through automobile auctions.

Floor planning (flooring) vehicles is a way to acquire inventory, but it can have negative consequences if payments (curtailments or payoffs) are not made on time. Curtailment schedules vary by floor plan providers, but they generally range from 5–20% of the original loan proceeds on each vehicle every 30/60/90/120 days. If curtailments are not made or the dealer enters into default on their obligations, floor plan companies will take action to minimize their exposure. Those actions include attaching to the bond (not all states require dealers to have bonds), repossessing the collateral, and other collection efforts.

Dealers of recreational vehicles, boats, major appliances, and manufactured/mobile homes may also use floor planning for all or part of their inventories.
