= Robert H. Garff =

American politician (1942–2020)

Speaker of the Utah House of Representatives
- In office 1985–1987
- Preceded by: Norman H. Bangerter
- Succeeded by: Glen E. Brown

Member of the Utah House of Representatives
- In office 1978–1987

Personal details
- Born: Robert Heiner Garff; September 15, 1942 Salt Lake City, Utah, U.S.
- Died: March 29, 2020 (aged 77) Salt Lake City, Utah, U.S.
- Cause of death: COVID-19
- Party: Republican
- Spouse: Katherine Bagley
- Children: 5, including Melissa Garff Ballard
- Parent: Ken Garff
- Education: University of Utah (BS, MBA)

Robert Heiner Garff (September 15, 1942 – March 29, 2020) was an American businessman and politician who served as chair of the Ken Garff Automotive Group. He also served as the speaker of the Utah House of Representatives from 1985 to 1987. He was a member of the Republican Party.

== Early life and education ==
Garff was born on September 15, 1942, the son of Marjorie Heiner and Kendall D. Garff. He attended the David Eccles School of Business at the University of Utah. He graduated with a bachelor's degree in 1966 and an MBA in 1967.

== Career ==
=== Business ===
The Ken Garff Automotive Group is a large car dealership conglomerate, founded in 1932 by Garff's father. The company or one of its dealerships, according to a January 2004 survey conducted by Dan Jones & Associates, was the second-most mentioned car dealership by Utahns when asked to name a car dealer. On October 18, 2007, the David Eccles School of Business announced that the automotive group donated $3 million to renovate the Garff Building.

In 2007, Garff launched a program to significantly expand the size of his dealer network with the backing of Jefferies Financial Group. At that time, the Garff Automotive Group had 40 dealerships in Utah, California, Nevada, Texas, Iowa and Indiana.

In addition to his family's automobile dealerships, Garff served in other business and civic roles. He was chairman of Intermountain Healthcare and chairman of the board of directors of the Deseret Book Company. He was also the owner of the Utah Blaze.

=== Politics ===
Garff served as speaker of the Utah House of Representatives from 1985 to 1987. He was chairman of the Salt Lake Chamber of Commerce, and chairman of the Salt Lake Organizing Committee for the 2002 Winter Olympics.

=== Awards ===
For his service and leadership in the community, Garff was given the Distinguished Utahn Award by the Salt Lake Chapter of the BYU Management Society in 2008. In 2021, he was posthumously awarded the Giant in our City award by the Salt Lake Chamber for his service and impact in the Salt Lake community, particularly in education. This award also recognized his wife, Katharine, who received the award.

== Personal life ==
Garff was married to Katharine (Kathi) Bagley, with whom he had five children, including politician Melissa Garff Ballard.

He served in various callings in the Church of Jesus Christ of Latter-day Saints, including bishop and stake president. From 1987 to 1990, Garff served as president of the church's England Coventry Mission. He later served as a member of the church's Sunday School General Board in 1991 and as a regional representative, beginning in 1992. In 2003, he became an area seventy, serving in the Fifth Quorum of the Seventy. From 2012 to 2015, he served as president of the Bountiful Utah Temple.

Garff died of COVID-19 in Salt Lake City, on March 29, 2020, during the COVID-19 pandemic in Utah.
