= Lorin N. Pace =

American politician (1925–2026)

Member of the Utah Senate from the 9th district
- In office 1986–1991

Member of the Utah House of Representatives from the 34th district
- In office 1964–1986

Personal details
- Born: August 15, 1925 Miami, Arizona, U.S.
- Died: February 24, 2026 (aged 100)
- Party: Republican
- Spouse: Marilynn Pace
- Profession: Attorney

Lorin Nelson Pace (August 15, 1925 – February 24, 2026) was an American politician who was a Republican member of the Utah House of Representatives and Utah State Senate. An attorney, Pace attended Emporia State University (Bachelor of Arts), Brigham Young University (Bachelor of Laws), and the University of Utah (Juris Doctor). He worked with the United States Department of State as a foreign service officer from 1954 to 1956 at San Pedro Sula, Honduras, where he also served as president of the San Pedro Sula Branch of the Church of Jesus Christ of Latter-day Saints for the first half of 1956. From 1956 to 1960, Pace served as a mission president for the Church of Jesus Christ of Latter-day Saints based in Buenos Aires, Argentina.

During his time in the House of Representatives, Pace served as Speaker of the House in 1969 and as Minority Leader from 1971 to 1975. He was defeated in the Republican primary for the 1990 election by Delpha Baird. After his legislative career, he served on the board of directors of Canton Industrial. In the early 1990s, Pace worked as a government consultant in El Salvador.

Pace died on February 24, 2026, at the age of 100.
